= List of psychoanalytical theorists =

Some the most influential psychoanalysts and theorists, philosophers and literary critics who were or are influenced by psychoanalysis include:

- Karl Abraham – psychoanalyst
- Nicolas Abraham – psychoanalyst
- Alfred Adler – founder of individual psychology
- Theodor Adorno – philosopher
- Salman Akhtar- psychoanalyst
- Franz Alexander – psychoanalyst
- Louis Althusser – philosopher
- Lou Andreas-Salomé – psychoanalyst
- Didier Anzieu – psychoanalyst
- Lisa Appignanesi
- Jacob Arlow
- Michael Balint – psychoanalyst
- Lee Baxandall
- Ernest Becker
- Jessica Benjamin – psychoanalyst
- Bruno Bettelheim
- Wilfred Bion – psychoanalyst
- Harold Bloom
- Christopher Bollas – psychoanalyst
- Marie Bonaparte — psychoanalyst
- John Bowlby – psychoanalyst
- Charles Brenner
- André Breton
- Abraham Brill – psychoanalyst
- Deborah Britzman
- Norman O. Brown
- Ruth Mack Brunswick – psychoanalyst
- Judith Butler – philosopher
- Cornelius Castoriadis
- Janine Chasseguet-Smirgel – psychoanalyst
- Nancy Chodorow
- David Cooper
- Joan Copjec
- Gilles Deleuze – philosopher
- Jacques Derrida – philosopher
- Helene Deutsch – psychoanalyst
- Françoise Dolto – psychoanalyst
- Terry Eagleton
- Kurt R. Eissler – psychoanalyst
- Max Eitingon – psychoanalyst
- Erik Erikson – psychoanalyst
- Horacio Etchegoyen – psychoanalyst
- Bracha L. Ettinger
- Ronald Fairbairn – psychoanalyst
- Pierre Fédida
- Shoshana Felman
- Otto Fenichel – psychoanalyst
- Sándor Ferenczi – psychoanalyst
- John Flügel – psychoanalyst
- John Forrester
- S. H. Foulkes – psychoanalyst
- Anna Freud – psychoanalyst
- Sigmund Freud – founder of psychoanalysis
- Erich Fromm – social psychologist
- Frieda Fromm-Reichmann – psychoanalyst
- Jane Gallop
- Carol Gilligan
- Edward Glover – psychoanalyst
- André Green – psychoanalyst
- Jay Greenberg – psychoanalyst
- Ralph R. Greenson – psychoanalyst
- Otto Gross
- Elizabeth Grosz
- Stephen Grosz – psychoanalyst
- Félix Guattari – philosopher
- Harry Guntrip – psychoanalyst
- Jürgen Habermas – philosopher
- G. Stanley Hall – psychologist
- Heinz Hartmann – psychiatrist and psychoanalyst
- Paula Heimann – psychoanalyst
- James Hillman - founder of Archetypal Psychology
- James Hollis - psychoanalyst
- Karen Horney – psychoanalyst
- Luce Irigaray – philosopher
- Susan Sutherland Isaacs – psychoanalyst
- Edith Jacobson – psychoanalyst
- Arthur Janov
- Adrian Johnston – philosopher
- Ernest Jones – psychoanalyst
- Carl Jung – founder of analytical psychology
- Eric Kandel
- Károly Kerényi
- Otto Kernberg – psychoanalyst
- Paulina Kernberg – psychoanalyst
- Masud Khan – psychoanalyst
- Melanie Klein – psychoanalyst
- Heinz Kohut – psychoanalyst
- Joel Kovel – psychoanalyst
- Julia Kristeva – psychoanalyst and philosopher
- Jacques Lacan – psychoanalyst
- Robert Langs – psychoanalyst
- R. D. Laing
- Jean Laplanche – psychoanalyst
- Darian Leader – psychoanalyst
- Jonathan Lear – psychoanalyst
- Claude Lévi-Strauss
- Hans Loewald – psychoanalyst
- Henry Zvi Lothane
- Alexander Lowen – psychoanalyst and psychiatrist
- Rudolf Löwenstein – psychoanalyst
- Jean-François Lyotard – philosopher
- Margaret Mahler – psychoanalyst
- Maud Mannoni – psychoanalyst
- Octave Mannoni – psychoanalyst
- Herbert Marcuse – philosopher
- Donald Meltzer – psychoanalyst
- Karl Menninger
- Adolf Meyer
- Juliet Mitchell – psychoanalyst
- Stephen A. Mitchell
- Toril Moi
- Juan-David Nasio
- Erich Neumann
- Susie Orbach – psychoanalyst
- Joy Osofsky – psychoanalyst
- Fritz Perls
- Adam Phillips – psychoanalyst
- Sandor Rado – psychoanalyst
- Otto Rank – psychoanalyst
- David Rapaport
- Wilhelm Reich – psychoanalyst
- Theodor Reik – psychoanalyst
- Laurence A. Rickels
- Paul Ricœur – philosopher
- Philip Rieff
- Joan Riviere – psychoanalyst
- Géza Róheim
- Avital Ronell
- Duane Rousselle - psychoanalyst and sociologist
- Jacqueline Rose
- Herbert Rosenfeld – psychoanalyst
- Élisabeth Roudinesco
- Benjamin B. Rubinstein
- Jurgen Ruesch
- Hanns Sachs – psychoanalyst
- Joseph J. Sandler – psychoanalyst
- Jean-Paul Sartre – philosopher
- Nina Searl
- Harold Searles – psychoanalyst
- Hanna Segal – psychoanalyst
- Roy Schafer – psychoanalyst
- Melitta Schmideberg – psychoanalyst
- Mark Solms
- Sabina Spielrein – psychoanalyst
- René Spitz – psychoanalyst
- Hyman Spotnitz
- Martin Stanton – psychoanalyst
- John Steiner – psychoanalyst
- Wilhelm Stekel – psychoanalyst
- Daniel N. Stern
- Robert J. Stoller – psychoanalyst
- Alix Strachey – psychoanalyst
- James Strachey – psychoanalyst
- Harry Stack Sullivan – psychoanalyst
- Neville Symington – psychoanalyst
- Arthur Tansley
- Victor Tausk – psychoanalyst
- Clara Thompson – psychoanalyst
- Mária Török – psychoanalyst
- Lionel Trilling
- Frances Tustin – psychoanalyst
- Vamık Volkan – psychiatrist
- Donald Winnicott – psychoanalyst
- Robert M. Young
- Elisabeth Young-Bruehl – psychoanalyst
- Gregory Zilboorg – psychoanalyst
- Slavoj Žižek – philosopher
- Alenka Zupančič – philosopher
