= Charles Brenner =

Charles Brenner may refer to:

- Charles Brenner (biochemist) (born 1961), American biochemist
- Charles Brenner (mathematician) (born 1945), American mathematician
- Charles Brenner (psychiatrist) (1913–2008), American psychoanalyst
