= Psychoanalysis: The Impossible Profession =

1981 book by Janet Malcolm

- Cover of the first edition
- Author: Janet Malcolm
- Language: English
- Subject: Psychoanalysis
- Publisher: Alfred A. Knopf
- Publication date: 1981
- Publication place: United States
- Media type: Print (Hardcover and Paperback)
- Pages: 192
- ISBN: 978-0394710341

Psychoanalysis: The Impossible Profession is a 1981 book about psychoanalysis by the journalist Janet Malcolm. It was published by Alfred A. Knopf. The book received positive reviews.

== Summary ==
Malcolm discusses the work of a psychoanalyst whom she refers to as "Aaron Green", concealing his real name through the use of a pseudonym. She describes his patients and teaching job at a local medical school, the influence of the psychoanalysts Charles Brenner and Jacob Arlow on his theory and technique, and his dismissal of other trends in psychoanalysis, such as those associated with Jacques Lacan, Otto Kernberg, Heinz Kohut, and Melanie Klein. "Green" reveals much of the inner politics of the New York Psychoanalytic Institute, to which he is attached. He also explores the challenges to his brand of ego psychology that were being presented by the British Object relations theory, and by such American figures as Kernberg and Kohut, in the late 20th century.

== Publication history ==
Based on material originally published in The New Yorker, Psychoanalysis: The Impossible Profession was published by Alfred A. Knopf in 1981.

== Reception ==
Psychoanalysis: The Impossible Profession received positive reviews from Joseph Adelson in The New York Times and Moss L. Rawn in Psychoanalytic Psychology. The book was also reviewed by Dianne F. Sadoff in The Antioch Review and Joseph L. DeVitis in the Journal of Thought, and discussed by the journalist Mary-Kay Wilmers in the London Review of Books. Malcolm discussed the book in an interview with the journalist Gaby Wood in The Daily Telegraph.

Adelson credited Malcolm with providing an accurate discussion of psychoanalysis, including "a lucid and accurate account" of its "current doctrinal disputes" and a "a chilling depiction" of its politics as an organized movement. He also believed that she conveyed "the claustral atmosphere of the profession". He concluded that Psychoanalysis: The Impossible Profession was an "artful book" in which Malcolm showed "a keen eye for the surfaces - clothing, speech and furniture - that express character and social role."

Wilmers described the book as a "very striking" book of reportage. Writing in The Boston Phoenix, Mac Margolis observed that the author seems "most taken with the profession" ... "From the subtitle — The Impossible Profession — onward, the book is a paean to the trade. Early on Malcolm casts the profession in practically epic terms."

The historian Peter Gay described Psychoanalysis: The Impossible Profession as a "witty and wicked" work that had been justly praised by psychoanalysts as "a dependable introduction to psychoanalytic theory and technique". He added that it had "the rare advantage over more solemn texts of being funny as well as informative."

== See also ==
- D. W. Winnicott
- Lady with lapdog
- Margaret Mahler
