= The Psychoanalytic Quarterly =

- Discipline: Psychotherapy
- Language: English
- Edited by: Neal Vorus

Publication details
- History: 1932–present
- Publisher: Taylor & Francis
- Frequency: Quarterly

Standard abbreviations
- ISO 4: Psychoanal. Q.

Indexing
- ISSN: 0033-2828 (print); 2167-4086 (web)

Links
- Journal homepage

The Psychoanalytic Quarterly is a quarterly academic journal of psychoanalysis established in 1932 and, since 2018, published by Taylor & Francis. The journal describes itself as "the oldest free-standing psychoanalytic journal in America". The current editor-in-chief is Neal Vorus.

== History ==
The Psychoanalytic Quarterly was established by Dorian Feigenbaum, Bertram D. Lewin, Frankwood Williams, and Gregory Zilboorg. In the opening issue they described the journal's aims:

This Quarterly will be devoted to theoretical, clinical and applied psychoanalysis. It has been established to fill the need for a strictly psychoanalytic organ in America…A close collaboration with associates abroad will be maintained. At the same time, a prime objective of the magazine is to stimulate American work and provide an outlet for it.

The first issue's lead article was Libidinal Types by Sigmund Freud, one of three articles by Freud translated by Edith B. Jackson and published in the journal in its first year. However, the new journal upset Ernest Jones in England, who saw it as a competitor to The International Journal of Psychoanalysis, which he edited. The new journal was also watched carefully by Smith Ely Jelliffe and William Alanson White of the National Psychological Association for Psychoanalysis, which published Psychoanalytic Review:

the Quarterly [...] is very excellent and I wish they would get on with it. I suspect that Lewin and his crows would get into hot water if someone read his paper and was after pornographic stuff; they could make it very hot. I do not know if I should warn Feigenbaum about it, as it might also include others, as you know the R. C. gentry are not asleep. The Quarterly has no special prospects. They will have to dig into their jeans or find an angel...

== Abstracting and indexing ==
The journal is abstracted and indexed in:

- Arts & Humanities Citation Index
- ATLA Religion Database
- EMBASE
- FRANCIS
- MEDLINE/PubMed
- MLA International Bibliography
- PsycINFO/Psychological Abstracts
- Scopus
- Social Sciences Citation Index
- SocINDEX
- Sociological Abstracts
- VINITI Database RAS
