= Rudolf Loewenstein =

Rudolf Loewenstein can refer to:

- Rudolf Löwenstein, German author
- Rudolph Loewenstein (psychoanalyst)
