= Psychoanalytic criminology =

Method of studying crime and criminal behaviour

Psychoanalytic criminology is a method of studying crime and criminal behaviour that draws from Freudian psychoanalysis. This school of thought examines personality and the psyche (particularly the unconscious) for motive in crime. Other areas of interest are the fear of crime and the act of punishment.

Criminal behaviour is attributed to maladjustment and dysfunctional personality. According to Buhagiar, "psychoanalytic criminologists were not adverse to the principle of confinement, and often favored increased penality".

When looking at a specific crime, like sexually motivated serial killers, for example, this psychoanalytic perspective can be very helpful. This lens allows for exploring the link between evil and aggression. In this paper that looks at the aggression of evil, and aggression through this perspective allows for the introduction of what 'evil' actually means. Looking at this crime psychoanalytically allowed the author to define evil as destructive aggression that is innate and reactive; as a result, he came to the conclusion that everyone has the capacity for evil and can be viewed as a reaction to threat or sense of endearment.

== Freudian psychoanalysis ==
Sigmund Freud is the established original psychoanalyst to form theories and concepts surrounding the existence of mental illness and its interconnected nature with human behaviour. Throughout his research, Freud concluded that behaviour can be explained through the analysis of one's experiences and trauma giving accountability to the motivation of a person's actions. The interpretation of his findings concluded a person can adapt his/her behaviour from childhood experiences to become a part of the hidden consciousness state. He studied unobservable behaviour, parts of the personality that are not visibly noticeable within one's nature and on a basic level cannot be explained.

In 1923, Freud formed an idea that the theoretical human mind had three elements that conceptually make up 'The Psyche'. Id (instincts), Ego (reality) and Superego (morality) are not tangible physical areas within the brain, rather, entities that Freud concluded make up the human personality. What Freud referred to as the "psychic apparatus", three elements of the human personality are now established as the unconscious level that dictates one's desires and biological instincts (see section 'Attributed Neurobiological Factors' for more details).

Freud did not directly use his research and theories to explain how a person is led to commit a crime, but the application of his theories has been adapted by psychologists and psychoanalysts to understand the connection between the unconscious mind and criminalistic tendencies and actions.

Within the realm of science, the study into psychoanalysis has been contested and debated according to its validity.

== History ==
Psychoanalytic criminology may be said to have begun with a 1911 study of parricide; but its real foundation came in 1916 when Freud published Criminality from a Sense of Guilt, in which he maintained that many criminals were driven by unconscious guilt which preceded the crime and led to a need for punishment. In applying psychoanalysis to the question of determining guilt or innocence in any given case, Freud was insistent however that analysis could only identify the guilty impulse, not necessarily the act itself.

Another major contribution came in 1929 with the book by Franz Alexander and Hugo Staub entitled The Criminal, the Judge and the Public. They drew a clear distinction between the normal criminal, for whom retribution was appropriate, and the neurotic criminal who needed treatment instead.

Otto Fenichel added the point that while some criminals actively sought punishment to relieve their unconscious guilt, others sought to avoid punishment in order to prove their guilt feelings were unjustified. He also stressed that criminality was a legal, not a psychological category, and considered most criminals were normals rather than neurotics (if still with unconscious motivations and possible lacks in normal consciences).

Psychoanalytic criminology was further developed by August Aichhorn, Melanie Klein, Fritz Redl, and David Wineman.

== Sociological association to crime ==
The sociological and environmental association to crime represents the "nurture" element of the term "Nature vs Nurture". An individual's social environment has a central effect on a person's moral compass, political ideology and potential personality traits. These aspects mould the identity of a person and inflict subconscious psychological effect on everyday behaviour, attitudes and criminogenic needs.

Research over the past five years indicates that a victim of a crime becomes more susceptible to expressing their trauma and/or psychological through violence and aggression. This is widely accepted as being the result of fostered trauma such as sexual assault or domesticated violence from early childhood. Consistent subjection to violence and abuse have shown correlative data that reflect dysfunctional behaviour and antisocial personality traits later on in life. Correlative variables do not indicate direct causation but lead to an additional variable leading to crime, for example, aggression and violent behaviour. Research has been conducted in both adult and children populations to investigate if there is a link between abuse in early life and incarcerated individuals. A published paper in 1999 explored an investigative review of 150 female inmates within maximum-security facilities. Browne, Miller and Maguin conducted interviews with each female individual and their results showed a high correlative pattern of early domesticated abuse leading to the motivation of crime. 70% of incarcerated women within the facility reported having experienced child sexual molestation, severe physical violence by parents and/or sexual violence by an acquittance or partner at some point in their life. Within the same sample, 78% claimed to have experienced a traumatic event within their life that had resulted in being diagnosed with post-traumatic stress disorder (PTSD).

Differential association claims that all criminals learn and adapt behaviours from individuals they are closely connected to, for example a relative or spouse. The theory recognises that the more contact an individual has will a criminal – the more likely one is to engage in criminalistic activities. Anomie, a theory proposed by Robert K. Merton explores the idea of social disintegration leading to crime. This theory focuses on individuals who are incapable of achieving their desired goals in society through legal and socially accepted means. In order to attain financial support or material goods, crime will emerge in time of desperation. This set or of moral values appeals towards the criminal subculture that disassociated to the rest of society - often stemming from a collective emotion of marginalisation e.g., gangs. This type of delinquency is strongly associated towards the low socio-economic class; poor and rural.

Neutralisation theory recognises that the average individual is deterred from crime as violent actions go against standardised moral standing as it leaves the individual with feelings of guilt and shame. The theory explores that some delinquent individuals attempt to 'neutralise' this sense guilt that provides relief therefore they internally condone their criminalistic behaviour. Individuals that possess tendencies to neutralise their behaviour, often conform to societally accepted behaviour and represent strong morals. By redefining their actions, it facilitates the individual commit crimes with more ease. Low self-control theory of crime enforces impulsive and risk-taking action, individuals that possess this trait seek short term satisfaction rather than long-term resulting in poor decision making and spontaneous violence against another individual. In contrast, labelling theory introduces the idea that by identifying an individual as a criminal will increasingly advocate the person to adopt criminal-like tendencies. By acquiring this identity, the individual may endorse feelings of isolation and rejection and become more estranged from feeling obligated to follow the law.

== Attributed Neurobiological factors ==
The study into the unconscious motive for criminal behaviour takes into account the uncontrollable variables human possesses such as the neurobiological pathways and reactions. The biochemical association towards crime must acknowledge psychophysiology, brain mechanism and genetic factors that contribute towards dysfunctional personalities.

Blunted autonomic functioning has been linked to individuals with antisocial behaviour and criminalistic tendencies. Blunted autonomic functioning is the state in which an individual has a reduced response to stimuli resulting in a low arousal capacity towards material that would otherwise cause distress and fear within the standard person. This has been recorded to induce a positive feedback loop, the low arousal level creates a low resting heart rate which then accounts for a reduced psychical response. This physiological trait creates a sense of fearlessness as the individual with blunted autonomic functioning does not experience the standardised physiological responses to distress that can be associated with discomfort. The lack of discomfort arouses the individual to engage in criminalistic behaviour to increase their arousal state as the person tends to have high levels of proactive aggression which does not deter the individual from carrying out criminal acts. Proactive aggression is the act of violence and rebel with little to no provocation. Blunted autonomic functioning impairs emotional intelligence by disallowing the development of feelings of shame, guilt and empathy hence resulting in psychopathic tendencies, behaviours and traits.

Physical somatic markers such as sweat conduction, give insight into the inter-relation between the emotional and physical state of an individual. The somatic changes of a person indicate the emotional state of a person while undergoing or viewing distressing material. The lack of somatic changes increases the likelihood to engage in crime as the individual cannot experience physical or emotional states that signal emotional discomfort to dissuade a person from committing violent crimes or generally violating the law.

The brain is acknowledged for contributing a key role in increasing tendencies that will ultimately lead to crime. The pre-frontal cortex and amygdala have a combined role in determining an individual's emotional state and his/her ability to recognise expressive emotions from the facial and auditory stimulus, particularly from negative and fearful emotions.

The Pre-frontal cortex (PFC) functions to form decision-making, moral reasoning, impulse regulation and attention and emotional control for individuals. Impairments and aberrations within these areas have led to observed criminalistic behaviours. A study conducted in 2018 reviewed 17 patients with brain lesions in research of identifying common characteristics of the effect of their injuries. The results concluded that regardless of the area of damaged tissue in the PFC, the patients were all left with disruption to their neuro-moral processes resulting in poor decision making and overall moral compass. These traits are associated with provoking criminal behaviours. Neurological pathways within the PFC cannot account for and explain all types of criminalistic tendencies that are found within individuals. The PFC influence criminals that have obvious signs and behaviours of violent and sadistic attitudes and behaviours. 'White-collar' criminals and successful psychopaths show standardised activity within their PFC with no signs of prefrontal deficits. In some cases, these types of criminals show increased activity within this lobe compared the average person which would otherwise indicate a strong moral compass and justified decision making.

The amygdala enables an individual to recognise auditory and facials expressions of emotions, especially ones that entail negative emotions. It also functions to condition fear into human behaviour hence to understand cues within their environment to trigger a fear response. These functions are understood to form a person's sense of morality and the 'fight-or-flight' response (Brealey, 2014). The amygdala also assists a person to mediate and assess risk for themselves and to protect others. A properly functioning amygdala deters individuals from risky behaviour. A person with an underdeveloped amygdala has the inability to detect negative emotions from another individual resulting in antisocial behaviour, as well as being incapable of understanding threat from their surroundings. Within adults, reduced volume of the amygdala increases the likelihood that the individual will display psychopathic characteristics (Ling Shichun, 2019). There are important distinctions to make to the effect and activity the amygdala has between subtype of offenders. Empirical research suggests that non-psychopathic criminals, those who react in an impulsive and emotional-aggressive way, displayed amygdala hypoactivity, which is defined as slowed neurological reactions within the lobe often associated with apathy and motor retardation.

Freudians theories are applicable within the biology realm as his concepts of the Id are associated with biological tendencies. Eros and Thanatos are believed to be under the unconscious set of instincts that are related to survival strategies, ones that drive humans to act on pleasure and desire. Freud understood that all instincts and human behaviour could not fall all into the one instinct category, rather he came to the conclusion that all behaviours fall into one of the two categories: Eros (life instincts) or Thanatos (death instincts). Eros is believed to have derived through adaption in order to enforce procreation for the species, this drive complex exerts desires for a one to engage in sexual relations with another individual. Positive emotions are associated this complex such as love, compassion, social cooperation and affections. The death instinct, Thanatos, enforces opposing drives for the individuals resulting in negative behavioural attributes and a poor state of wellbeing. These can be displayed in a person through aggression and violent mannerism, often these feelings can cause mental illness causing self-harm and suicidal thoughts or actions. Freud supported his theories by concluding that Thanatos drove people to react or re-enact on traumatic experiences from their past often leading to many criminal offences. His theories explain this concept is derived from unconscious desire to die. Freud recognised that largely people have inherited survival drives, and his theories were counter-intuitive towards the majority of mentally sane individuals. The internal conflict between Eros and Thanatos cause contrary desires causing the potential for anxiety. It is concluded in Freuds theories that life instincts hinder much of what the death instincts subconsciously desire.

== Dysfunctional and antisocial personality ==
The relationship between personality and criminalistic traits is assessed using a variety of independent measures to detect psychopathic traits. Assessing a dysfunctional lifestyle is carried out through the measure of, lack of empathy, wide mood swings, impulsive and egocentric behaviour. Antisocial behaviour is often categorising people that have a lack of sensitivity towards other individuals and disregard for people's right to safety and emotional wellbeing. Studies into recidivist criminals shows that their personality centres around enabling the individual to attack others and creating formulated crimes. Once and individual senses there is organisation within their crime, empirical studies have shown that it incites compulsive crime. Crime-prone personalities begin to dissociate the physical human being from their thoughts and feelings allowing violent and repetitive assault of other individuals.

Abnormal thinking and dysfunctional personality have correlative patterns that show similar emotional capacity that is displayed within behaviour. Professor Hans Eysenck distinguish three antisocial personality traits that become apparent through behaviour, the traits indicate criminalistic tendencies through their dysfunctional state. The first dimension that is recognised is the tendency for the individual to be impulsive and aggressive, generally describes as psychoticism. Neuroticism is the second aspect of Eysenck's research, resulting in individuals to have a low self-esteem and mood swings. The third is extrovertive traits such as being dominant, assertive and thrill-seeking.

Investigations into the interlink between murderers and their dysfunctional and antisocial personalities explore their psychological and behavioral traits. They revealed that there was a lack of standard productivity levels, reduced imaginative and intellectual capacity, and the disability to form relationships. A weak social identity was also recorded as a result of inmates with drug-dependent behavior and higher rates of emotional instability, leading to suicidal thoughts and behaviors. The lack of potent social skills is strongly associated with poor self-esteem and intense psychological anxiety and hostility.

== Criticism ==
Forensic psychiatry saw psychoanalytic criminology in a relatively negative light, with the twin dangers of acting as an apologist for the criminal and oversimplifying criminal motivation at the fore.

Others have seen an inherent contradiction between value-neutral psychoanalysis, committed to healing, and the demands of the legal system; while Thomas Szasz objected to the open-ended, paternalistic concept of 'treating' the neurotic criminal as an infringement of human rights in the name of social control.

== See also ==
- Gregory Zilboorg
- Restorative justice
- Victimology
