= Bernhard Alexander =

Hungarian writer and professor (1850–1927)

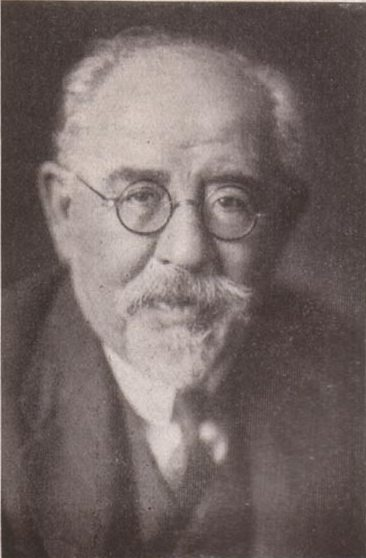
Bernhard Alexander

Bernhard ("Bernát") Alexander (Austrian German: [ˈbɛrnhard ˈalɛksandɐ]; born Alexander Márkus, Hungarian: [ˈɒlɛksɒndɛr ˈmaːrkʊʃ]; 13 April 1850 – 23 October 1927) was a Hungarian writer and a professor of philosophy and aesthetics.

== Life and career ==
Alexander was born Alexander Márkus in Pest, (Note: The cities of Buda and Pest and the town of Óbuda were merged as the city of Budapest in the fall of 1873.) Austrian Empire (now Budapest, Hungary), on 13 April 1850 to a Jewish family and educated in his native city, later attending German universities, where he pursued studies in the fields of philosophy, aesthetics and pedagogy. On his return to Hungary he was appointed to a teaching post in a Realschule (scientifically oriented high school) in Budapest, and in 1878 was admitted as a docent into the faculty of philosophy at the Faculty of Humanities of the University of Budapest, where he became a full professor in 1895. From 1892, he also lectured on dramaturgy and esthetics at the National Theater Academy, and on the latter subject and on the history of civilization at the Francis Joseph Polytechnic. He was a corresponding member of the Hungarian Academy of Sciences and a member of the Kisfaludy Society, a major force in Hungarian literature. He was the father of Franz Alexander, a Hungarian-American psychoanalyst and physician, who is considered one of the founders of psychosomatic medicine and psychoanalytic criminology, and maternal grandfather of Alfréd Rényi, a Hungarian mathematician who made contributions in combinatorics, graph theory, number theory but mostly in probability theory.

== Works ==
Alexander's chief works are A philosophia történetének eszméje, tekintettel a történetre általában (The idea of the history of philosophy, in consideration of history in general, 1878); Kant. Élete, fejlődése és philosophiája (Life, development and philosophy, 1881); A XIX. század pesszimizmusa: Schopenhauer és Hartmann (The pessimism of the 19th century: Schopenhauer and Hartmann, Budapest, 1884, prize essay). Alexander, together with Józef Bánóczi, later edited a seminal series of books on philosophers, the Filosofiai Irók Tára, for which he did translations and annotations of René Descartes, David Hume, and the Prolegomena to Immanuel Kant. Jointly with Bánóczi, he translated Kant's Critique of Pure Reason. He was an active writer on matters of education, editing the pedagogical journal Magyar Tanügy from 1882 to 1886.

== Exile and death ==
However, Alexander became a pariah in the nationalistic, anti-Semitic environment of post-1919 Hungary and Miklós Horthy's government, and spent four years abroad. He died in Budapest on 23 October 1927.
