= Gardner Botsford =

American editor and writer (1917–2004)

- Born: Robert Gardner Botsford; July 7, 1917
- Died: September 27, 2004 (aged 87)
- Education: Yale University
- Occupations: Editor; writer
- Employer: The New Yorker
- Notable work: A Life of Privilege, Mostly
- Spouses: Katharine Chittenden (died 1974) Janet Malcolm (m. 1975)
- Military career
- Allegiance: United States
- Branch: United States Army
- Unit: 1st Infantry Division
- Conflicts: World War II; D-Day (Omaha Beach)
- Awards: Bronze Star Medal; Croix de Guerre

Robert Gardner Botsford (July 7, 1917 – September 27, 2004) was an American soldier, editor, and writer. He worked at The New Yorker for nearly 40 years, where he edited the work of many well-known writers, most famously Janet Malcolm, whom he married.

== Early life ==
Botsford was the son of Ruth Gardner, who was admired for her beauty, and Alfred Miller Botsford. His father was a journalist for the New York World; after divorcing Ruth, the elder Botsford moved to Hollywood and became a publicity executive for Paramount Pictures and Twentieth Century Fox. Ruth remarried the wealthy Raoul Fleischmann, heir to the Fleischmann's Yeast fortune, and Botsford was brought up in a large townhouse with servants on the Upper East Side. Divorcing Fleischmann, she then married Peter Vischer, a journalist who later worked at the United States Foreign Service. In his memoir, Botsford describes Vischer as a "hustler" whose sympathies, in the 1930s, were with the Germans. He attended Yale University, where he wrote a humor column for the Yale Daily News titled "Once Over Lightly."

== Military service ==
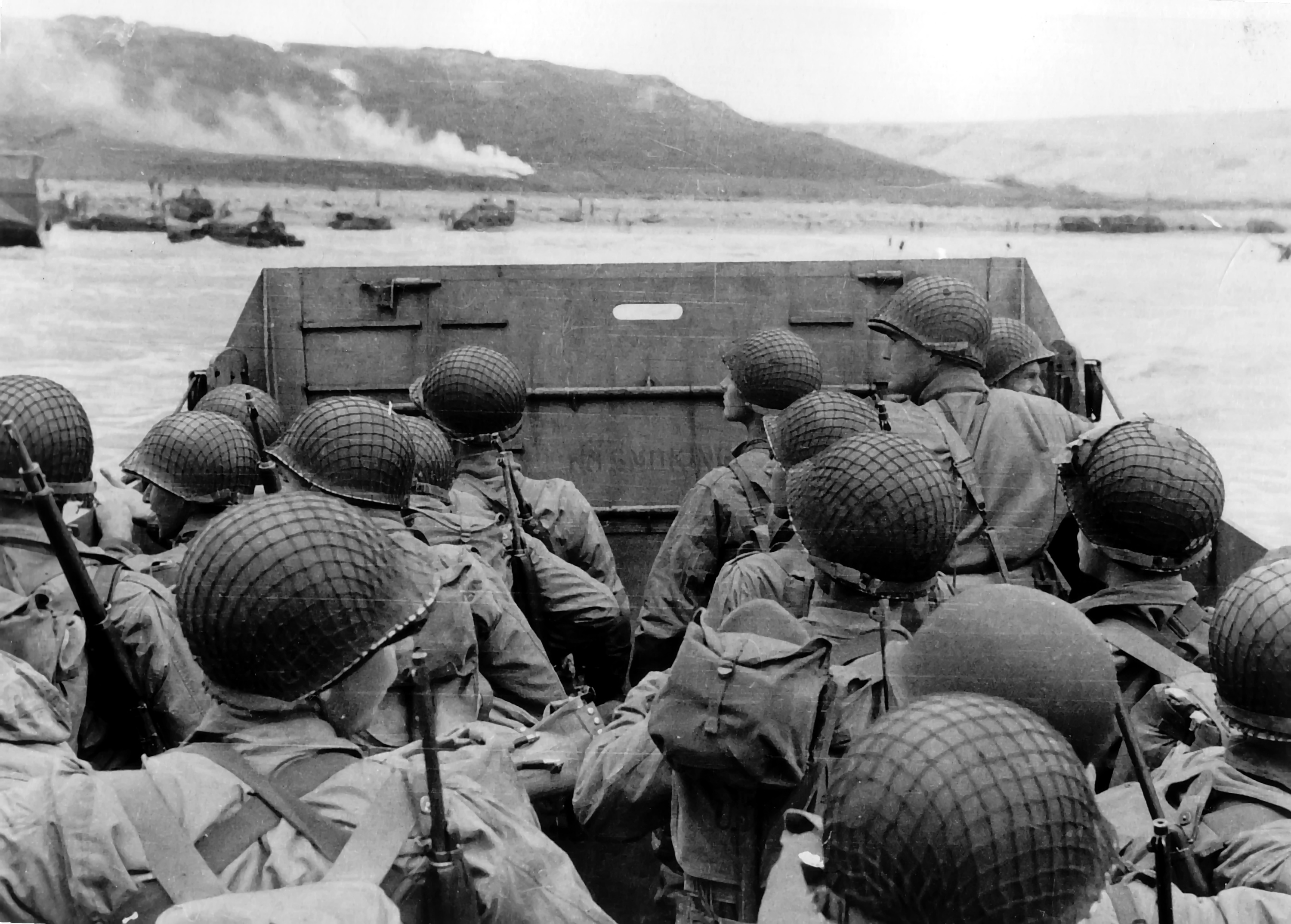
Botsford and his unit prepare to land at Omaha Beach. Botsford is in the front row of the LCVP, closest to the "No Smoking" sign.

Botsford was drafted into the United States Infantry in World War II, and sailed for Scotland on the Queen Mary. He was then assigned to the First Infantry, temporarily based in Dorset. With the First, he landed at Omaha Beach on D-Day; he is prominently featured in a well-known photograph of the landing, taken by an anonymous Army Signal Corps photographer. Botsford, who spoke French, was assigned the task of contacting members of the French Resistance immediately after landing. In later years, Botsford spoke of the chaos and confusion of the war, and the patchy memories it left him. "You couldn’t really grasp anything that wasn't right straight in front of you," he told NBC News. "What was going on to my right and left, I have no idea. I know where I was and what I was doing, but even that is kind of an in-and-out memory." In an opinion piece in The New York Times, contrasting older wars, in which the infantry bore the greatest risk, with those of the twenty-first century, in which civilians do, he recalled: "Until I set foot on the Normandy sands, I was a chap of calm and sanguine disposition whose worst anxieties were on the order of seeing a traffic cop in the rearview mirror; now, in a single tick of a clock, I became a marionette on a string, ducking and weaving in an effort to get away from the invisible bits of metal I could hear buzzing like bees above my head and past my ears." Wounded by shrapnel in the war, Botsford was awarded a Bronze Star and the French Croix de Guerre.

== Literary career ==
Botsford had multiple connections to The New Yorker: his stepfather, Raoul Fleischmann, had cofounded it with Harold Ross, and he met A. J. Liebling, whom he would later edit, in wartime France. After Botsford graduated from Yale, Ross hired and fired him in quick succession, telling him he needed newspaper experience; he found it at the Jacksonville Journal. He was eventually hired back, and rose to be one of the most influential people at the magazine. At the height of his career, due both to his editorial work and his connection with Fleischmann, he "was perceived to have an unofficial veto power" on important decisions. One of the many writers he worked with, Jeremy Bernstein, recalls him as an exacting editor unafraid to profoundly transform a piece of writing, as he did in reworking Peter Matthiessen's The Snow Leopard into a less mystical, more adventure-driven article. To force his writers to rethink their prose, Bernstein reports, Botsford would insert nonsense (like "A stitch in time makes Jack a dull boy") into the proofs of articles. One writer evidently referred to him as "The Ripper" for his editorial aggressiveness.

Botsford's later years at The New Yorker were sometimes difficult. His editing of his wife Janet Malcolm's writing on the murder trial of Jeffrey R. MacDonald was subjected to scrutiny, some of it harsh, when Malcolm was sued by one of her sources, Jeffrey Moussaieff Masson, for defamation. He clashed with the chief editor, William Shawn, over plans for the magazine's future; Shawn reportedly came to regard Botsford and his friend Roger Angell as "enemies." Botsford officially retired in 1982, though he continued to be involved. Not long before his death, he published a memoir of his patrician childhood, his experiences in the war, and his career at The New Yorker, titled A Life of Privilege, Mostly.

== Personal life ==
Botsford married twice. His first wife, Katharine Chittenden, known as Tass, appears only sparsely but unhappily in his memoir. She died in 1974. He married one of the prominent New Yorker writers he edited, Janet Malcolm, the following year; she had also been recently widowed. In late work published after Botsford's death, Malcolm revealed a number of previously unknown details about their relationship, including that they had had an extramarital affair before their spouses' deaths. They also seem to have shared a puckish sense of humor. Decades after the fact, Malcolm acknowledged that a snapshot she had presented as the work of a professional in her book on photography, Diana and Nikon, was actually an anonymous picture Botsford had found in a pile of rejected materials at The New Yorker and, as "an exercise in absurdism," framed and retained. Malcolm writes with relish of the "delicious condescension" of a reviewer of the book who relied heavily on the photograph in attacking her "wrongheadedness."
