= Occupational psychosis =

Unhealthy biases and behaviors associated with occupations and careers

Occupational psychosis occurs when one's occupation or career makes one so biased that one could be described as psychotic. Especially common in tight occupational circles, individuals can normalize ideas or behaviours that seem absurd or irrational to the external public.

== Overview ==
The term was created by John Dewey. The most accessible introduction to this concept is Chapter III of Kenneth Burke's Permanence and Change. Burke is careful to say, "Incidentally, it might be well to recall that Professor Dewey does not use the word 'psychosis' in the psychiatric sense; it applies simply to a pronounced character of the mind" [original emphasis] (pg. 49.).

In fact, Robert K. Merton's notion of occupational psychosis is also important: "The transition to a study of the negative aspects of bureaucracy is afforded by the application of Thorstein Veblens concept of "trained incapacity," Dewey's notion of "occupational psychosis" or Daniel Warnotte's view of "professional deformation". Trained incapacity refers to that state of affairs in which one's abilities function as inadequacies or blind spots. Actions based upon training and skills which have been successfully applied in the past may result in inappropriate responses under changed conditions. An inadequate flexibility in the application of skills will, in a changing milieu, result in more or less serious maladjustments. Thus, to adopt a barnyard illustration used in this connection by Kenneth Burke, chickens may be readily conditioned to interpret the sound of a bell as a signal for food. The same bell may now be used to summon the trained chickens to their doom as they are assembled to suffer decapitation. In general, one adopts measures in keeping with one's past training and, under new conditions which are not recognized as significantly different, the very soundness of this training may lead to the adoption of the wrong procedures. Again in Burke's almost echolalic phrase, "people may be unfitted by being fit in an unfit fitness"; their training may become an incapacity.

Dewey's concept of occupational psychosis rests upon much the same observations. As a result of their day-to-day routines, people develop special preferences, antipathies, discriminations and emphases. (The term "psychosis" is used by Dewey to denote a "pronounced character of the mind".) These psychoses develop through demands put upon the individual by the particular organization of his occupational role.

The concepts of both Veblen and Dewey refer to a fundamental ambivalence. Any action can be considered in terms of what it attains or what it fails to attain."

And again Merton footnotes Permanence and Change (1935), pp. 50, 58–59: "I believe that John Dewey's concept of "occupational psychosis" best characterizes this secondary aspect of interest. Roughly, the term corresponds to the Marxian doctrine that a society's environment in the historical sense is synonymous with society's methods of production. Professor Dewey suggests that a tribe's ways of gaining sustenance promote certain specific patterns of thought which, since thought is an aspect of action, assist the tribe in its productive and distributive operations. This special emphasis, arising in response to the economic pattern, he calls the tribe's occupational psychosis. Once this psychosis is established by the authority of the food-getting patterns (which are certainly primary as regards problems of existence) it is carried over into other aspects of the tribal culture."

== See also ==
- Absorption (psychology)
- Adaptation
- Cognitive distortion
- Déformation professionnelle
- Delusion
- Einstellung effect
- Groupthink
- Island mentality
- Mindset
- Work motivation
