= Robert Langs =

American psychiatrist

- Born: June 30, 1928; Brooklyn, New York, U.S.
- Died: November 8, 2014 (aged 86); New York City, U.S.
- Occupations: Psychotherapist, psychoanalyst, psychiatrist
- Known for: Adaptation-centered psychoanalytic psychotherapy

Robert Joseph Langs (June 30, 1928 – November 8, 2014) was a psychiatrist, psychotherapist, and psychoanalyst. He was the author, co-author, or editor of more than forty books on psychotherapy and human psychology. Over the course of more than fifty years, Langs developed a revised version of psychoanalytic psychotherapy, currently known as the "adaptive paradigm". This is a distinctive model of the mind, and particularly of the mind's unconscious component, significantly different from other forms of psychoanalytic and psychodynamic psychotherapy.

== Overview ==
Langs treated psychoanalysis as a biological science, subject to the laws of evolution and adaptation. As with any living species, coping with environmental threats—and the resultant stresses and psychological traumas– must lie at the heart of human life including human psychological life. Langs’ research led him to posit the existence of a mental module he termed the "emotion-processing mind," a psychic function which evolved to ensure the survival of the species. Langs contended that it had done so at the cost of adaptive failures and with devastating emotional consequences. He maintained that he had identified the assets and limitations of the emotion processing mind clinically and shown how the insights from this approach can help correct adaptive deficits, allowing more fulfilling lives, both individually and collectively. Langs therefore rejects the prevailing belief among psychoanalytic traditions that sexual or aggressive wishes and fantasies, the need for sound relationships with and affirmations from others, or self-actualization are the main issues in emotional life (see psychoanalysis). For Langs, the latter may be significant in any given clinical situation but precisely to the extent that they raise issues associated with emotional adaptation.

Langs revamped the psychoanalytic view of the unconscious mind, in accordance with his evolutionary approach. According to him, the unconscious mind operates on the basis of perceptions outside of awareness – subliminal or unconscious perceptions – much as the conscious mind operates on the basis of conscious perceptions, i.e. perceptions within awareness. The unconscious mind evolved, according to Langs, due to the development of language acquisition, which brought with it the uniquely human awareness of the future and, correspondingly, the sense of our own mortality and other death-related issues. This realization of mortality is often evoked by traumatic incidents and, thus, the anxiety-provoking ramifications of those experiences are barred from consciousness, though perceived unconsciously and then adaptively processed towards resolution. In contrast to classical psychoanalytic theory, which tends to view the unconscious mind as a chaotic mix of drives, needs, and wishes (see psychoanalysis), Langs sees the unconscious mind as an adaptive entity functioning outside of direct awareness.

Because the conscious mind finds death-related traumas and stresses unbearable, it tends to deny the anxiety-provoking meaning of traumatic events but thereby also loses the potential wisdom that the traumatic experience might confer. According to Langs, the conscious mind thereby adapts, by surviving the event that seemed unbearable, but simultaneously fails to adapt, by leaving unconscious what it might have gained from the experience. Thus an important goal of adaptive therapy is to access the wisdom of the unconscious mind, which is denied at the conscious level due to the pain and anxiety associated with the traumatic event.

According to Langs, the activities of unconscious processing reach the conscious mind solely through the encoded messages that are conveyed in narrative communications like dreams. He maintains that, as a rule, dreams are responses to current traumas and adaptive challenges and that their story lines characteristically convey two sets of meanings: the first expressed directly as the story qua story, while the second is expressed in code and implicitly, disguised in the story's images. We can tap into our unconscious wisdom by properly decoding our dreams, i.e. by linking the dream to the traumas that have evoked them—a process Langs calls “trigger decoding”. This process, according to Langs, is the essence of self-healing based on deep insight.

Langs' work also expanded beyond individual therapy into social issues. For example, Langs’ focus on how human beings cope with reality and traumas resulted in his identifying three forms of unconsciously experienced death anxiety and in his showing how each form can mark a universal or archetypal path to devastation, not only individually but collectively. Langs’ work also moved into questions of spirituality, in part because so much of religion deals with death-related phenomena. Langs developed ways of recognizing what triggers death anxieties and also ways of neutralizing their destructive effects.

In summary, Langs' approach to psychotherapy is deeply rooted in the psychoanalytic tradition, but differs from mainstream psychoanalysis in significant ways: he (1) draws his approach from evolutionary biology and the principle of adaptation; (2) treats the unconscious according to adaptive principles; (3) roots psychic conflict fundamentally in death anxiety and death-related traumas.

== Life and work ==
Langs was born in 1928 in Brooklyn, New York. His undergraduate education was at the University of Pennsylvania (1945–1948), and his graduate medical education at the Chicago Medical School. He worked in various internships and residencies at the US Public Service Hospital in Staten Island, The Albert Einstein College of Medicine, The Bronx Municipal Hospital Center, and The Research Center for Mental Health at New York University (1953–1965). His psychoanalytic training was at the Downstate Medical Center in Brooklyn, New York, from 1959 to 1968, where he supervised with Jacob Arlow. Langs has held numerous professional and academic positions. He was also an Honorary Visiting Fellow at the School of Psychotherapy and Counselling, Regent's College, London, England.

Langs has authored, co-authored or edited more than 175 scholarly articles and 47 books, ranging over many distinct genre. Among these genre are systematic psychoanalytic investigations, training texts, substantive transcripts from supervision sessions, popular books of applied psychoanalysis, plays, historical-analytical studies. His publications have been translated into the major Western European languages, as well as Russian and Japanese. Langs was also editor of the International Journal for Psycho-Analysis from 1972 to 1983.

Dr. Langs wrote and lectured all over the world on dreams, emotions, unconscious communication, and the science of the mind. His last speaking engagement was at the Library of Congress. He was a visiting professor at Mount Sinai Hospital in New York City and an honorary visiting fellow with the School of Psychotherapy and Counseling, Regents College, London. He is the founder of the "communicative-adaptive" school of psychoanalysis and psychoanalytic psychotherapy. Langs is best known for his rigorous emphasis on establishing and maintaining a secure frame for analysis, his development of the concept of the bi-personal field, and his extensive documentation of encoded transference derivatives in the analytic interaction.

It is useful to divide Langs’ publishing career into four more or less distinct phases, based on the central themes of interest in each, though themes from earlier phases tend to re-emerge in new ways in the later periods of Langs' career. Since there is a major shift between the second and third phases, discussion of reactions to Langs' work will come after the second phase and again after the fourth phases below.

Langs and his wife had a house on Bell Place in Amagansett. He and Ms. Raphael were married in 1990. They had lived in Plainview and Roslyn.

=== First phase ===
In the first phase, from about 1968 through the mid-1970s, Langs worked with a classical psychoanalytic approach, focused on the transference and on the analysis of dreams, dreams being interpreted in terms of disguised wishes and fantasies. he was already concerned at this date with the distinction between intrapsychic fantasies and experiences of reality. This distinction, according to him, cuts across both conscious and unconscious realms, thus permitting a careful look at unconscious perceptions (as opposed to unconscious fantasies). Unconscious perceptions became crucial for Langs' psychoanalytic psychotherapy because, whereas most classical psychoanalytic notions of the unconscious mind suggest that unconscious contents are purely intrapsychic fantasies, Langs insisted that some unconscious experiences are unconscious perceptions of reality, a point with substantial implications for therapeutic practice. For example, if there are unconscious perceptions, one would expect the unconscious mind of a patient to communicate (among other things) the experience of erroneous interventions on the part of the therapist. In the latter case, the therapist could not assume that such experiences were mere fantasies on the part of the client. Rather, the therapist must assume that there could be some validity to the patient's unconscious perception and therefore that the patient may be perceiving the truth of the matter in experiencing therapist errors.

From early on, Langs analyzed this connection between psychic experience and reality in terms of "adaptation," suggesting that psychic phenomena should be interpreted in terms of the goals of adaptation in the individual, an adaptive process which refers not only to the patient's life outside of the consulting room but also and especially to the patient's experiences within the consulting room. There are striking parallels here between Langs' and some of Carl Jung's earlier work, which also emphasized adaptation, though Langs appears to have come to this conclusion independently of any knowledge of Jung's ideas. Though some classical Jungian thinkers emphasize adaptation, Langs appears to put adaptation more at the center of his work than either Jung or most Jungians.

=== Second phase ===
The focus on unconscious perception in the client led Langs to a focus on therapeutic technique, one of the salient characteristics of his second phase, extending from the mid-1970s through the 1980s. This phase is characterized by a number of supervision transcripts published in book form, where Langs develops a number of ideas that came to be essential to his approach. Langs' study of dreams led him to recognize analogies with his earlier clinical research, such that he could distinguish between two different kinds of dream interpretation: those interpretations which read dreams purely in terms of fantasy and thus in isolation from the patient's experience of reality versus those interpretations which read the dream as intimating something of the client's experience and adaptation to reality. Langs generalized this distinction to the therapeutic relationship, where he focused on what he termed the "adaptive context," i.e. the motivating adaptive experiences which provoked or "triggered" certain types of dreams, fantasies, etc. Langs notes that this distinction allows for two different ways of interpreting a patient's experiences and communications: as products of purely intrapsychic fantasy or as products of a patient's attempt to adapt to (the experience of) reality.

Clinically, Langs developed a complex and sophisticated understanding of so-called "derivative" or "disguised" or "unconscious communication" (i.e., those communicative expressions which include implicit reference to unconscious experiences). Although awareness of derivative communication was not new to psychoanalytic clinical theory, he made listening for derivative communication a centerpiece of his theory of analytic practice. Langs differentiated "Type 1" derivatives, which refer solely to the client's internal experiences, from "Type 2" derivatives, which arise from the patient's attempts to adapt to reality, at times evoking psychic conflict. Over time, he would focus almost exclusively on "Type 2" derivatives, especially as they are discovered in the therapeutic relationship. In particular, Langs would use unconscious derivative communications from the patient as a way of validating or invalidating therapeutic interventions, an element of therapeutic practice he retains to this day. It is at this point that Langs began to call his approach the "communicative approach," highlighting thereby the specific way of listening to clients' unconscious communication, as experienced in the therapeutic field. At times he would also term the approach "adaptational-interactional," again focusing on (1) the adaptive character of psychic experiences and (2) the communication of the meaning of those experiences in therapy, via Type 2 derivatives, which are in part based on the interaction between patient and therapist. Over time, he would call the adaptive context a "trigger" and the interpretation of derivative communications—what Langs now typically calls "encoded communications"—in the light of adaptive triggers, "trigger decoding".

Also during this phase, Langs not only had his own practice but was supervising other therapists. Langs began to notice frequent unconscious references to the breaking of therapeutic "ground rules"—a term which refers to the basic context or "frame" in which psychotherapy is practiced such as time, place, fee etc.. This highlighted for Langs the centrality of ground rules and framework for therapy, as well as the problems associated with modifying or, worse, violating the frame of therapy. Langs thus develops one of the hallmarks of his approach which has continued throughout his career, namely, an emphasis on the management of the ground rules and frame of psychotherapy and the many ways in which therapists appear to be unaware of the importance of the therapeutic frame for doing successful psychotherapy.

=== Discussion of the first two phases ===
All in all, Langs' work in these first two phases is deeply rooted in and yet simultaneously critical of the psychoanalytic tradition. Langs' early work borrows heavily from leading classical psychoanalysts, above all from Freud, as well as from authors in the broader psychoanalytic tradition such as Donald Winnicott, Wilfred Bion, Harold Searles, Ralph Greenson, Michael Balint, and Willy and Madeleine Baranger.

From the Barangers, Langs derived the notion of the "therapeutic field", emphasizing that therapy is not only about the patient but also about the interaction between patient and therapist. This interaction, what Langs terms the "bi-personal field," includes many dimensions, which Langs analyzes in several supervision texts, drawing heavily from Winnicott and Balint. Among the characteristics of this field, according to Langs, is that the client's unconscious perceptions of failure on the part of the therapist can lead to the patient to try to heal the therapist, a point Langs draws from Searles.

The impact of Langs' work on American psychoanalysis during this period would be difficult to overestimate. One indication of Langs' influence is the 1984 anthology Listening and Interpreting. The Challenge of the Work of Robert Langs, edited by James Raney MD. As Raney put it in his introduction:

"In a little more than a decade, Robert Langs has made a remarkable contribution to the field of psychoanalytic psychotherapy. As a result of his determined search for the unconscious meanings of emotional disturbance, he has reworked older psychoanalytic ideas and introduced major innovations in psychotherapeutic understanding and technique."

— James Raney MD

The articles of this collection aim to "extend, criticize, and apply Langs's ideas in novel areas from their unique clinical perspectives". Several widely known psychotherapists, such as Masud Khan, Merton Gill and Patrick Casement, contributed to this volume. Also during this period, Langs initiated book-length clinical dialogues with prominent psychoanalysts, including Harold Searles and Leo Stone, as well as an extended discussion on transference and countertransference with Margaret Little.

Langs' publications in this period produced many and varied reactions. Some reviewers considered Langs' work largely a rehashing of the classical psychoanalytic tradition without adding new insights though, as a rule, even those who asserted Langs' lack of originality were quick to point out that Langs always attributed credit to his sources. Some also objected to the tone of Langs' work, suggesting that Langs was more confident in his conclusions than his work merited. In other cases, Langs' work was considered a significant advance over previous psychoanalytic texts.

In particular, his work The Listening Process garnered high praise for articulating a proper listening and validating process for psychoanalysis and psychotherapy, based on listening to derivative communications, something assumed but not as fully developed in the tradition as in Langs' work. Concerning the lack of developed technique for listening to unconscious derivative communications, one reviewer said that Langs' "book attempts to rectify these problems and in doing so,[Langs] identifies every meaningful component of the listening process, explores its basic dimensions, analyzes the intricacies of manifest and latent content of both client and therapist, warns of the dangers of countertransference-based influences, and clearly elucidates the psychoanalytic basis of the listening process."

A further area of controversy was Langs' insistence on the potential contribution of the therapist or analyst to defenses and/or resistances in patients. A common criticism of his work in this period was that his emphasis on an ideal frame and an ideal of technique was too constricting. For example, Patrick Casement acknowledged that he was influenced by Langs' work, yet later distanced himself from it saying of Langs that he ". . . thinks that there is only one right way of working analytically".

Langs' impact in this period was not restricted to psychoanalysts and psychoanalytic therapists but, even at this point, extended especially to Jungian analysts as well. A leading Jungian analyst and noted founder of the "developmental school" of Jungian analysis, Michael Fordham, reviewed Langs' two-volume The Therapeutic Interaction. Fordham describes Langs' book in glowing terms, noting how much more developed Langs' work in technique is compared to anything in the analytical (Jungian) psychology of the time. Parks considered this Fordham review the start of Langs' influence on Jungians. Among the Jungians most impacted by Langs was William Goodheart, who not only used his work in his own research, but defended the value of Langs' work in dialogue with Jungians critical of Langs, such as James Hillman. Langs' continues to influence Jungian psychoanalysis, as for example in a recent book by Jungian psychoanalyst and author John R. White, entitled Adaptation and Psychotherapy; Langs and Analytical Psychology, which develops a clinical approach to psychoanalysis uniting ideas from both Langs and Jung.

=== Third phase ===
Langs' third and fourth phases are motivated by different sets of issues and can plausibly be described as distinct phases. Nonetheless it is the investigations and conclusions derived from both phases together that constitute Langs' current approach, which he has most recently termed "the adaptive paradigm of psychotherapy".

The third phase in Langs' work, stretching roughly from the mid-1980s to the mid-1990s, was motivated by a new set of clinical puzzles. The immediate clinical issue for Langs was that, on the one hand, patients in secured-frame therapy settings—i.e. unconsciously validated therapy with an ideal set of ground rules—tended to encode images validating both the therapy and the frame. On the other hand, these same patients appeared to flee from secured-frame therapy and the boundaries it requires, often ending therapy abruptly and without warning. According to him, when the anxieties these patients unconsciously communicated were decoded, it appeared that existential death anxieties were at the root of the patients' reactions. These factors entailed a set of puzzles requiring some level of resolution, including why the mind would react against what it knows unconsciously to be healing? And why indeed is there such a discrepancy between consciousness and the unconscious, such that consciously one is fleeing therapy which unconsciously is perceived to be healing? Indeed, why is there any differentiation between conscious and unconscious at all?

Langs found that the clinical literature did little to illuminate this set of problems. After many attempts to find answers to these and related questions, he turned to formal areas of research outside the clinical and psychoanalytic literature, especially to developments in evolutionary biology and the laws of primate communication, research which resulted in a quantitative science of emotionally charged communication in both therapy in particular and life in general. Langs' work in this period takes on a more straightforwardly biological cast than his previous work and the mind is understood in terms of natural, evolutionary processes. Among the developments in this phase of his work is a complex differentiation of distinct mental functions ("mental modules") which articulate the mind in terms of both conscious-unconscious and deep unconscious systems, along with other auxiliary mental modules. Langs sought to explain biologically why these distinct mental modules function as they do. By working through the evolutionary and communicative problems, he came to believe that the evolutionary selection processes favors minds which are prone to death denial, since the alternative appeared to be facing potentially overwhelming anxiety over the inevitability of death.

A product of this research was Langs' break with the standard psychoanalytic model of the mind. In Langs' account, Freud's later structural model of the mind, with its emphasis on the difference of id, ego, and superego resulted in the loss of Freud's deepest insights. The crucial original discovery of Freud, according to him, is contained in the earlier topographical model of mind, in which there are two profoundly diverse mental systems, the conscious system and the unconscious system. In contrast, the structural model treats of the unconscious as merely those contents of the ego, id or superego of which one is currently unaware, understating the profound differences between the conscious and unconscious systems and in practice modelling the unconscious on the conscious mind. Consequently, the most important insight contained in Freud's earlier, topographical model of the mind—the stark difference between conscious and unconscious system—is, according to Langs, all but lost in the later model.

Langs' own model of the mind accommodates elements from each of Freud's models while articulating something new. Langs distinguishes between the "unconscious" (or "superficial unconscious") and the "deep unconscious". The "unconscious" or "superficial unconscious" mind—the descriptor "superficial" denoting a contrast with "deep," not a value judgment—is a part of a complex conscious mental system with its own laws of functioning and its own form of communication. The "deep unconscious system," in contrast, has a different set of functions and laws and also, a different form of communication. The latter, according to Langs, communicates in terms of encoded derivatives, in part because straightforward conscious communication about death-related traumas would be too difficult to bear. Hence the work of the adaptive therapist includes learning to hear the encoded derivative communications both to discover the sources of psychic conflict which arise from the diverse points of view the conscious and unconscious systems have on life events, with a specific focus on death anxiety and death-related traumas and, second, to obtain encoded validation of therapeutic interventions. A potential critique of classical psychoanalytic practice is contained in Langs' new model of the mind, namely, that standard psychoanalytic practice only touches on the unconscious or superficial unconscious, without ever getting to the deep unconscious, which can only be accessed through encoded derivative communications.

During the period, Langs wrote a number of popular texts and books written for clients rather than for therapists. Among these are popular texts on dreams and on unconscious communication, a workbook designed to measure the value of one's psychotherapist, and a book on doing self-analysis. Langs also published a book on self-processing classes.

=== Fourth phase ===
The fourth phase of Langs' career, from about the mid-1990s until the end of his life in the 2010s, came in the wake of this expanded view of the psyche, and led to new clinical theses. His work linking evolutionary biology to the unconscious psyche required that Langs turn his attention to the problem of extinction and, with it, death and death anxiety. His researches in this field yielded the conclusion that death anxieties and death-related traumas lie at the root of psychic conflict. The deep unconscious system contains, among other things, intense experiences associated with death, because the conscious mind feels too overwhelmed by them. Consequently, due to evolutionary alterations of the emotion-processing mind, denial and obliteration rather than repression are the basic defenses of the psyche. He distinguishes three kinds of death anxiety: predatory, predator and existential. Predatory death anxiety arises from the feeling that one may be or may become a victim of someone else's death desires. Predator death anxiety arises from the experience of wanting to kill or harm someone else and includes accompanying guilt. Existential death anxiety, the most difficult to face, consists in the straightforward awareness that one will and must die. Each of these forms of death anxiety have their distinct effects on the conscious mind. For example, with unconscious predator anxiety comes the tendency to self-punishing behaviors and unexplained but profound guilt.

This differentiation of various kinds of unconscious death anxiety also illustrates how Langs’ more recent work integrated his earlier work. For example, much of Langs’ early work focused on the importance of therapists honoring the therapeutic frame and its boundaries. Langs’ later development of death anxiety offers an explanation of why clients (and therapists) may avoid keeping to strict therapeutic boundaries, namely, that honoring them may evoke anxiety about the inevitable boundary beyond which no human can survive: death. Furthermore, successfully secured-frame therapies tend to bring patients to a deeper awareness of their own unconscious death anxieties, which itself can lead to the termination of therapy if the patient experiences these anxieties as overwhelming. Nonetheless, facing these anxieties and learning how to process the emotional experiences which arise from them, is one of the key purposes of the adaptive approach to therapy.

Langs' emphasis on how to listen to the deep unconscious system allows for the development of his proposed scientific approach to psychoanalysis. According to him, much of contemporary psychoanalytic practice is not conducive to understanding the deep unconscious, in part because the images and models of the unconscious which underlie contemporary psychoanalytic theory are derived from the images and models of the conscious system. Furthermore, there are strong motives, rooted in death anxiety, even for psychoanalysts to deny or ignore the deep unconscious system and substitute what amount to merely repressed conscious system contents for the genuine deep unconscious system. The deep unconscious system, on his account, is of quite another order from the conscious system and thus requires both a different way of perceiving it (listening to it) and a different model of mind from those derived from the conscious system. Langs defines a way of listening to the deep unconscious system, through trigger-decoded interpretations, making it possible, he believes, to understand the deep unconscious system as well as to operationalize unconscious perceptions in a meaningful scientific way.

Some of Langs' later work concerning the deep unconscious and issues associated with death anxiety displays derivations from or parallels to ideas associated with Carl Jung's later theories, in particular Langs' use of Jung's notion of the "archetypes". It had been noted earlier that Langs' emphasis on the frame suggested a closer link to Jung than Freud, and Langs appears to link up his latest work more explicitly with Jung. Lang's death anxiety theory also highly correlates to the ideas and findings of Stanislav Grof, a psychiatrist and one of the founders of the field of transpersonal psychology.

== The adaptive paradigm of psychotherapy ==
If Langs' third and fourth phases together can be said to constitute his later position, "the adaptive paradigm of psychotherapy", it is safe to say that these developments were not greeted with the same enthusiasm as the work of Langs' second phase was. Langs' new emphasis on the biological and evolutionary basis of psychoanalytic theory and practice was baffling to many. One reviewer suggested that Langs' idea that psychoanalysis is biological science is a myth of Langs' own making. Other reviewers considered Langs' later achievements considerable but less important and less original than Langs himself thought.

Some discussions of Langs' later views echoed criticisms of the earlier period. The Jungian August Cwik praised Lang's book on supervision, on many grounds and concludes that "Langs has once again given us food for thought". Nonetheless, Cwik added that Langs, "with some tempering of his extreme sense of certainty, [has] illuminated a teaching interaction which is at the core of our craft. Langs' efforts to understand death anxiety in his fourth phase led more or less naturally to investigations into religion and spirituality, since religions often deal with death, with claims to life after death, and with other death-related themes. Langs' book on the topic met with mixed reviews. Abramovitch, a Jungian analyst and scripture scholar, gave negative reviews to Langs' efforts, suggesting that Langs was out of his league to even treat of the issues. In contrast, the psychoanalyst and Jesuit William Meissner considered the book "a provocative and thought-provoking account that will challenge many of the convictions and persuasions of analytically oriented thinkers about these topics".

The adaptive approach is in essence and per se a biological science by definition. It is by its nature a component of the science of evolutionary biology whose central task entails the scientific study of the evolution and adaptive resources of the emotion processing mind.

As a whole, the third and fourth phases of Langs' work have not been met with the interest or enthusiasm of his first two phases. Langs acknowledged this state of affairs, but also suggested that at least some of the lukewarm reception of his work might have been due to the unpleasantness of the message, namely, that the roots of psychic conflict are in death-related trauma and anxiety, requiring therefore of both patient and therapist that they face their own death anxieties head-on.

== Some characteristics of the adaptive paradigm ==
=== A way of listening ===
The most characteristic feature of Langs' approach to psychotherapeutic practice is his way of listening to the patient, focusing on unconscious derivative or encoded communications which express latent, deep unconscious experiences and perceptions. Though listening for encoded derivatives is certainly found in the psychoanalytic tradition, traditional psychoanalytic theory tended to interpret them as unconscious fantasies rather than adaptive responses to unconscious perceptions of reality, as Langs interprets them. There appears little current emphasis on listening to encoded derivatives in contemporary psychoanalytic practice. In contrast to contemporary practice, listening for encoded derivatives takes a central—indeed predominant—place in Langs' work. Furthermore, in contrast to mainstream psychoanalysis, Langs connects derivative themes to "triggers," i.e. activating events born of the patient's attempt to adapt consciously to the vicissitudes of life and both consciously and unconsciously to his or her early traumas. Whereas Langs' earlier work sought primarily frame and ground rule violations through encoded communications, there is now a greater emphasis on listening for encoded communications of patients' traumas. In this way, Langs emphasizes the adaptive nature of the unconscious psyche as a key for interpreting encoded derivatives and thus for understanding deep unconscious processes. Langs' approach differs from psychoanalytic approaches which treat the unconscious in purely intrapsychic terms, as opposed to giving primacy to processes of external adaptation.

=== Narratives ===
Not every form of communication on the part of a patient is productive of the unconscious encoded perceptions a Langsian therapist might seek. Langs' work in communication science draws the conclusion that narratives are the only source of such encoded derivative communication. Narratives have the advantage of being a form of two-fold communication, having both a conscious manifest level and an unconscious latent level. When the patient recounts a dream or makes up a narrative, therefore, both levels can in principle be discerned and the unconscious communications can be decoded. For this reason, Langs retains the analytic practice of emphasizing the use of dreams and what he terms "guided associations" related to the elements and themes of the dreams, since dreams typically take the form of narratives and thus communicate unconscious encoded material. In any given case, the therapist may use spontaneously formulated narratives on the part of the client – "origination narratives"—in the same way as a dream, since the key issue is whether the client offers narrative communications of any kind which can be decoded in terms of adaptive triggers. The client relates guided free associations to the themes of the narrative communication, producing a pool of themes which, in turn, illuminate unconscious conflicts. This practice too highlights a difference between Langs and mainstream psychoanalytic, Jungian and other depth-oriented approaches to therapy and analysis, in that traditional approaches tend to focus on the dream and use associations to elucidate the dream whereas Langs inverts the order of importance, considering the value of dreams to be that they attract associations from which the therapist can extract broader pools of themes for interpretation.

=== Death anxiety and death-related traumas ===
The ultimate triggers which result in psychic conflict are death-related traumas and the consequent death anxiety such traumas evoke. Thus the task of the adaptive psychotherapist is to aid the client to come to grips with such triggers and learn how to process the emotional traumas, past and present, associated with them. Langs' theory of mind, developed in the third phase of his work, highlights that what he terms the "deep unconscious system" is the locus of the unconscious perceptions and associated anxieties which are death-related. The reason for this is that what Langs calls the "emotion processing mind" has evolved in such a way that it separates out the deepest, most painful traumas (and aspects of trauma) from both the conscious and superficial unconscious experiences, stowing the painful and overwhelming traumas and anxieties in the deep unconscious system for the sake of easier conscious adaptation. While on some level this may be advantageous to the continuation of the species and, in that respect, beneficial to evolutionary aims, at another level it is a failed process. The members of the human species, on Langs' account, are therefore highly susceptible to denial and obliteration of the deepest traumas, more or less guaranteeing that they will not be healed and tending them to deep unconscious death anxieties, profound guilt, violent acting out and other emotional disturbances. Due to both the depth and the pain involved in these unconscious realities, they cannot be accessed directly, but only indirectly through encoded, narrative themes and their relationship to unconsciously perceived triggers. Hence the importance of listening for encoded derivative communications and themes expressed in narratives and seeking out the triggers which evoke them.

=== Securing the frame ===
Secured-frame therapy, which includes among other traits unconsciously validated ground rules, total privacy, total confidentiality, relative anonymity and several other characteristics Lang's delineates, is most beneficial for the patient dealing with death-related traumas and anxieties. At the same time, Langs' research suggests that this most healing therapeutic situation can also be a source of deep anxiety in the patient, because the clearly defined boundaries resonate in the deep unconscious as reminders of the ultimate boundary, death. Hence patients may flee secured-frame therapy both (1) because the secured frame evokes unconscious death anxiety, often driving patients to try to break the frame or (2) because, having experienced the security of the frame, the bringing of death anxiety to awareness itself produces overwhelming anxiety. It thus becomes incumbent on the adaptive therapist to manage both a patient's attempting to break the frame and the anxiety the patient may have within the secured frame, based on the overwhelming experience of death anxiety and allied experiences.

== Recent directions ==
Dr. Langs died in November 2014 after a long struggle with amyloidosis. His most recent published book was entitled Freud on a Precipice. How Freud's Fate Pushed Psychoanalysis over the Edge, which looks at the impact of Freud's biography on how the latter formulated his underlying theories. Among the points of interest for Freud interpretation is Langs' hypothesis that Freud changed from his topographical to structural theories in part because of his own death anxiety. Besides several recently published articles, Langs was also working on a book-length study on American presidents and the traumas which have driven them. He was also working on a memoir, tentatively entitled The Devil is in the Genes.

== Works (books only) ==
- Langs, R. (1972). LSD: Personality and Experience (With H. Barr, R. Holt, L. Goldberger, & G. Klein). New York: Wiley.
- Langs, R. (1973). The Technique of Psychoanalytic Psychotherapy, Volume 1. New York: Jason Aronson.
- Langs, R. (1974). The Technique of Psychoanalytic Psychotherapy, Volume 2. New York: Jason Aronson.
- Langs, R. (1976). The Bipersonal Field. New York: Jason Aronson.
- Langs, R. (1976). The Therapeutic Interaction: Abstracts of the Psychoanalytic Literature. Volume 1. New York: Jason Aronson.
- Langs, R. (1976). The Therapeutic Interaction: A Critical overview and Synthesis. Volume 2. New York: Jason Aronson.
- Langs, R. (1977). The Therapeutic Interaction: A Synthesis. New York: Jason Aronson.
- Langs, R. (1977). Psychotherapeutic Conspiracy (Classical Psychoanalysis and Its Applications). Jason Aronson, Inc.
- Langs, R. (1978). The Listening Process. New York: Jason Aronson.
- Langs, R. (1978). Technique in Transition. New York: Jason Aronson.
- Langs, R. (1979). The Supervisory Experience. New York: Jason Aronson.
- Langs, R. (1980). The Therapeutic Environment. New York: Jason Aronson.
- Langs, R. (1980). Interactions: The Realm of transference and countertransference. New York: Jason Aronson.
- Langs, R. (1981). Classics in Psychoanalytic Technique (Editor). New York: Jason Aronson.
- Langs, R. (1981). Resistances and Interventions: The nature of Therapeutic Work. New York: Jason Aronson.
- Langs, R. (1982). Psychotherapy: A Basic Text. New York: Jason Aronson.
- Langs, R. (1982). The Psychotherapeutic Conspiracy. New York: Jason Aronson.
- Langs, R. (1983). Unconscious Communication in Everyday Life. New York: Jason Aronson.
- Langs, R. (1985). Madness and Cure. Lake Worth, FL: Gardner Press.
- Langs, R. (1985). Workbooks for Psychotherapists, Volume 1: Understanding Unconscious Communication. Emerson, NJ: Newconcept Press.
- Langs, R. (1985). Workbooks for Psychotherapists, Volume 2: Listening and Formulating. Emerson, NJ: Newconcept Press.
- Langs, R. (1985), Workbooks for Psychotherapists, Volume 3: Intervening and Validating. Emerson, NJ: Newconcept Press.
- Langs, R. (1988). A Primer of Psychotherapy. Lake Worth, FL: Gardner Press.
- Langs, R. (1988). Decoding Your Dreams. New York: Henry Holt; also: Ballantine paperback.
- Langs, R. (1989). Rating Your Psychotherapist: The Search for Effective Cure. New York: Henry Holt; also: Ballantine paperback.
- Langs, R. (1990). Rating Your Psychotherapist: Find Out Whether Your Therapy Is Working and What to Do If It's Not. Holt (Henry) & Co, U.S.
- Langs, R. (1991). Take Charge of Your Emotional Life. New York: Henry Holt.
- Langs, R. (1992). A Clinical Workbook for Psychotherapists. London: Karnac Books.
- Langs, R. (1992). Science, Systems, and Psychoanalysis. London: Karnac Books, 1992.
- Langs, R. (1993). Empowered Psychotherapy. London: Karnac Books.
- Langs, R. (1993). The Therapeutic Experience and Its Setting: A Clinical Dialogue (Therapeutic Experience & Settin C). Jason Aronson, Inc. (first published March 1980
- Langs, R. (1994). Doing Supervision and Being Supervised. London: Karnac Books.
- Langs, R. (1994). The Dream Workbook. Brooklyn, NY: Alliance Publishing.
- Langs, R. (1995). Clinical Practice and the Architecture of the Mind. London: Karnac Books.
- Langs, R. (1995). The Daydream Workbook. Brooklyn, NY: Alliance Publishing.
- Langs, R. (1996). The Evolution of the Emotion-processing Mind: With an Introduction to Mental Darwinism. London: Karnac Books.
- Langs, R., Badalamenti, A. & Thomson, L. (1996). The Cosmic Circle: The Unification of Mind, Matter and Energy. Brooklyn, NY: Alliance Publishing.
- Langs, R. (1997). Death Anxiety and Clinical Practice. London: Karnac Books.
- Langs, R. (1998). Ground Rules in Psychotherapy and Counseling. London: Karnac Books.
- Langs, R. (1998). Current Theories of Psychoanalysis. (Editor). Madison, CT: International Universities Press.
- Langs, R. (1999). Psychotherapy and Science. London: Sage.
- Langs, R. (1999). Dreams and Emotional Adaptation. Zeig, Tucker.
- Langs, R. (2000). Freud's Bird of Prey (A Play in Two Acts). Zeig, Tucker.
- Langs, R. (2004). Fundamentals of Adaptive Psychotherapy and Counseling. London: Palgrave-Macmillan.
- Langs, R. (2006). Love and Death in Psychotherapy. London: Palgrave-Macmillan.
- Langs, R. (2008). Beyond Yahweh and Jesus: Bringing Death's Wisdom to Faith, Spirituality, and Psychoanalysis. Latham, MD: Jason Aronson.
- Langs, R. (2009). Managing Managed Care: Psychotherapy and Medication Management in the Modern Era. Latham, MD: Jason Aronson.
- Langs, R. (2010). Freud on a Precipice: How Freud's Fate Pushed Psychoanalysis Over the Edge. Latham, MD: Jason Aronson.
- Langs, R. & H. Searles (1980). Intrapsychic and Interpersonal Dimensions of Treatment: A Clinical Dialogue. New York: Jason Aronson.
- Langs, R. & L. Stone (1980). The Therapeutic Experience and its Settings. New York: Jason Aronson.

== See also ==
- Psychoanalysis
- Psychotherapy
- Analytical psychology
- Sigmund Freud
- Carl Jung
- Death anxiety
- Unconscious communication

== Bibliography ==
- Abramovitch, H. (2008) Review of Beyond Yahweh and Jesus, Journal of Analytical Psychology, vol. 53, no. 5, 724–5.
- Adler, G. (n.d.) Studies in Analytical Psychology. New York: G. P. Putnam's Sons
- Badalamenti, A. J. (1996). Langsian psychology and physics. Behavioral Science, vol. 41, issue 3, 215–230.
- Bornstein, R. (2005). Metatheoretical shifts and extraclinical data. Psychoanalytic Psychology vol. 22, no.1, 69–72.
- Casement, P. (1984) The reflective potential of the patient as mirror to the therapist. In Raney (1984).
- Casement P. (1990) Further Learning from the Patient. London: Routledge
- Cohen, J. (1982) Review of Resistances and Interventions. American Journal of Psychotherapy, vol. 36, no. 4, 571–573.
- Cwik, A. (1996) Review of Supervision and Being Supervised, Journal of Analytical Psychology, vol. 41, no, 4
- Fordham, M. (1987). Review of The Therapeutic Interaction. Journal of Analytical Psychology, vol. 23, issue 2, 193–196.
- Freud, S. (2010) The seduction theory revisited. American Journal of Psychotherapy, vol. 64, no. 3, 307–315.
- Goodheart, W. B. (1980). Theory of Analytic Interaction. San Francisco Jung Institute Library Journal 1(4): 2–39.
- Goodheart, W. B. (1987a). A Clinical Illustration. Contemporary Psychoanalysis, 23(l): 145–161.
- Goodheart, W. B. (1987b). Towards an Understanding of Freud's Overlooking Unconscious Perception. Yearbook of Psychoanalysis and Psychotherapy, 2: 46–68.
- Goodheart, W. B. (1988a). The Deviant Frame and Career Success. Newsletter of the Society for Psychoanalytic Psychotherapy, 3(l): 6–7.
- Goodheart, W. B. (1988b). Scientific Evidence vs. Authoritative Opinion: The Dilemma Posed by the Pollock Case. Newsletter of the Society for Psychoanalytic Psychotherapy, 3(2): 6–8.
- Goodheart, W. B. (1988–89). Freud, Jung, Goethe, Langs: Decoding Your Dreams and the Illusiveness of 'Human Stuff'. Newsletter of the Society for Psychoanalytic Psychotherapy, 3(3) and 4(l): 16–20.
- Goodheart, W. B. (1989). Crises of Revision: Phlogistic Thinking in the 18th Century and Psychoanalytic Theory in our own. Newsletter of the Society for Psychoanalytic Psychotherapy, 4(3): 4–9.
- Goodheart, W. B. (1993). Between Freud and Charcot: Beginning Steps from Psychoanalysis and Folk Psychology towards an Interactional Science of Emotional Cognition and Communication. International Journal of Communicative Psychoanalysis and Psychotherapy, 8(1): 3–15.
- Goodheart. W. B. (2005). Discussion of the "Challenge of the strong adaptive approach". Psychoanalytic Psychology, vol. 22, no. 1, 73–77.
- Gutheil, T. (1984) Review of Unconscious Communication in Everyday Life. vol. 38. no. 4, 587.
- Jung, C. G. (1970) Psychoanalysis and neurosis. In Freud and Psychoanalysis, Collected Works vol. 4, Princeton N.J.: Princeton University Press
- Jung, C. G., (1981). The Archetypes and the Collective Unconscious. 2nd ed. Collected Works Vol.9 Part 1, Princeton, N.J.: Princeton University Press
- Kugler, P. & Hillman, J. (1985) The autonomous psyche: A communication to Goodheart from the bi-personal field of Paul Kugler and James Hillman. Spring 1985, 141–185
- Langs, R. (1973). The Technique of Psychoanalytic Psychotherapy, Volume 1. New York: Jason Aronson.
- Langs, R. (1974). The Technique of Psychoanalytic Psychotherapy, Volume 2. New York: Jason Aronson.
- Langs, R. (1976a). The Bipersonal Field. New York: Jason Aronson.
- Langs, R. (1976b). The Therapeutic Interaction: Abstracts of the Psychoanalytic Literature. Volume 1. New York: Jason Aronson.
- Langs, R. (1976c). The Therapeutic Interaction: A Critical overview and Synthesis. Volume 2. New York: Jason Aronson.
- Langs, R. (1977), The Therapeutic Interaction: A Synthesis. New York: Jason Aronson.
- Langs, R. (1978). The Listening Process. New York: Jason Aronson.
- Langs, R. (1978). Technique in Transition. New York: Jason Aronson.
- Langs, R. (1979). The Supervisory Experience. New York: Jason Aronson.
- Langs, R. (1980). The Therapeutic Environment. New York: Jason Aronson.
- Langs, R. (1981). Resistances and Interventions: The Nature of Therapeutic Work. New York: Jason Aronson.
- Langs, R. (1983). Unconscious Communication in Everyday Life. New York: Jason Aronson.
- Langs, R. (1988). Decoding Your Dreams. New York: Henry Holt; also: Ballantine paperback.
- Langs, R. (1989). Rating Your Psychotherapist: The Search for Effective Cure. New York: Henry Holt; also: Ballantine paperback.
- Langs, R. (1991). Take Charge of Your Emotional Life. New York: Henry Holt.
- Langs, R. (1993). Empowered Psychotherapy. London: Karnac Books.
- Langs, R. (1994). Doing Supervision and Being Supervised. London: Karnac Books.
- Langs, R. (1996). The Evolution of the Emotion-processing Mind: With an Introduction to Mental Darwinism. London: Karnac Books.
- Langs, R., Badalamenti, A. & Thomson, L. (1996). The Cosmic Circle: The Unification of Mind, Matter and Energy. Brooklyn, NY: Alliance Publishing.
- Langs, R. (1997). Death Anxiety and Clinical Practice. London: Karnac Books.
- Langs, R. (2004). Fundamentals of Adaptive Psychotherapy and Counseling. London: Palgrave-Macmillan.
- Langs, R. (2004a). Death anxiety and the emotion processing mind, Psychoanalytic Psychology, vol. 21, no. 1, 31–53
- Langs, R. (2005). The challenge of the strong adaptive approach. Psychoanalytic Psychology, vol. 22, no. 1, 49–68.
- Langs, R. (2008). Beyond Yahweh and Jesus: Bringing Death's Wisdom to Faith, Spirituality, and Psychoanalysis. Latham, MD: Jason Aronson.
- Langs, R. (2010). Freud on a Precipice: How Freud's Fate Pushed Psychoanalysis Over the Edge. Latham, MD: Jason Aronson.
- Langs, R. & H. Searles (1980). Intrapsychic and Interpersonal Dimensions of Treatment: A Clinical Dialogue. New York: Jason Aronson.
- Langs, R. & L. Stone (1980). The Therapeutic Experience and its Settings. New York: Jason Aronson.
- Lepper, G. (1996) Review of Empowered Psychotherapy, Journal of Analytical Psychology, vol. 41, no. 1, 151–2.
- Levy, S. (1985) Principles of Interpretation. New York and London: Jason Aronson
- Little, M. I. (1981). Transference Neurosis & Transference Psychosis. New York: Jason Aronson
- Meissner, W. (2009) Review of Beyond Jesus and Yahweh. Bulletin of the Menninger Clinic, vol. 73, no. 2, 154–155.
- Movahedi, S. (2000) Review of Dreams and Emotional Adaptation. Modern Psychoanalysis, vol. 25. no. 1, 138–141.
- Parks, S. (1987). Experiments in appropriating a new way of listening. Journal of Analytical Psychology, vol. 32, 93–115.
- Raney, J., ed. (1984). Listening and interpreting. The challenge of the work of Robert Langs. New York: Jason Aronson
- Samuels, A. S. (1985). Jung and Post-Jungians. London & Boston: Routledge & Kegan Paul
- Shave, D. W. (1979) Review of The Listening Process. American Journal of Psychotherapy, vol. 33. no. 2, 316–318.
- Werman, D. S. (1980) Review of Technique in Transition. American Journal of Psychotherapy, vol. 34, no. 1, 138–141
- White, J. R. (2012) Review of Freud on a Precipice by Robert Langs, Journal of Analytical Psychology, vol. 57, issue 1, 127–8. https://www.academia.edu/2152467/Review_of_Freud_on_a_Precipice_by_Robert_Langs
- White, J. R. (2023) Adaptation and Psychotherapy. Langs and Analytical Psychology. Lanham: Rowman & Littlefield. ISBN 978-1-5381-1794-1. Preface to the book can be found at https://www.academia.edu/90664738/Preface.
- White, J. R. (2024) “The Jungian Analyst in between Life and Death. Clinical Ethics in a Time of Pandemic,” in Jungian Analysis in a World on Fire: At the Nexus of Individual and Collective Trauma, Tuley & White, eds., Routledge, 2024. Compares Langs and Jung on their respective psychologies of death and death anxiety. https://www.academia.edu/130441069/The_Jungian_Analyst_in_between_Life_and_Death_Clinical_Ethics_in_an_Age_of_Pandemic
