= Autoplastic adaptation =

Autoplastic adaptation (from the Greek word auto) is a form of adaptation where the subject attempts to change itself when faced with a difficult situation.

The concept of autoplastic adaptation was developed by Sigmund Freud, Sándor Ferenczi, and Franz Alexander. They proposed that when an individual was presented with a stressful situation, he could react in one of two ways:

- Autoplastic adaptation: The subject tries to change himself, i.e. the internal environment.
- Alloplastic adaptation: The subject tries to change the situation, i.e. the external environment.

== Autoplasticity, hysteria and evolution ==
'Hysterical individuals appear to be turned inward. Their symptoms, instead of presenting actions directed outward (alloplastic activities), are mere internal innervations (autoplastic activities)'.

Freud, with 'his single-minded Lamarckianism', speculated that behind 'Lamarck's idea of "need"' was the 'power of unconscious ideas over one's own body, of which we see remnants in hysteria, in short, "the omnipotence of thought"'.

As a result, among his immediate followers, 'Insight into this regressive nature of the phenomenon of conversion may be taken as a starting-point for speculation about the archaic origin of the capacity for autoplastic conversion...according to which evolution took place through the autoplastic adaptation of the body to the demands of the environment'.

== Cross-cultural autoplasticity ==
'Cross-cultural helpers have debated what has been called the autoplastic/alloplastic dilemma: how much should clients be encouraged to adapt to a given situation and how much...to change? Most Western helping modalities have a strong autoplastic bias; clients are encouraged to abandon traditional beliefs...to fit into a dominant society's mainstream'.

The analytic relationship is sometimes seen in similar terms: 'the two practitioners in treatment are engaged in an unending struggle between changing the other and effecting internal change..."autoplastic" and "alloplastic"'.

== See also ==
- Atlas personality
- Bovarysme
- Internalized oppression
- Occupational psychosis
- Victim soul
