= Laurence A. Rickels =

American literary and media theorist (born 1954)

Laurence Rickels
- Born: December 2, 1954 (age 71); Cherokee, Iowa, United States

Philosophical work
- Era: 20th-/21st-century philosophy
- Region: Western philosophy
- School: Psychoanalysis · Frankfurt School · Deconstruction
- Main interests: German literature, Science fiction, Cultural studies, media theory, the Occult
- Website: https://larickels.com

Laurence Arthur Rickels (born December 2, 1954) is an American literary and media theorist, whose work examines psychoanalysis, media culture, and German intellectual history. His scholarship draws on the traditions of the Frankfurt School and deconstruction in its engagement with psychoanalysis and mass-media culture. His books include ''The Case of California'' (1991), ''The Vampire Lectures'' (1999), and the three-volume ''Nazi Psychoanalysis'' (2002).

== Early life and education ==
Rickels was born in Cherokee, Iowa on December 2, 1954. He currently resides and works in Palm Springs and Berlin.

Rickels studied English literature as an undergraduate at the University of Pennsylvania, receiving a Bachelor of Arts in 1975. During this period he also spent time studying in Germany in connection with the Free University of Berlin.

He continued his graduate studies at Princeton University, where he completed a Ph.D. in German literature in 1980. His doctoral dissertation examined visual imagination and representation in the work of Gotthold Ephraim Lessing, Gottfried Keller, and Franz Kafka.

== Academic career ==
Rickels taught in the Department of Germanic, Slavic and Semitic Studies at the University of California, Santa Barbara, where his teaching and research focused on psychoanalytic theory, German literature, film, and media culture. He was also affiliated with interdisciplinary programs at UCSB in film studies, comparative literature, and cultural studies.

In 2011 Rickels was appointed professor of Art and Theory at the Academy of Fine Arts Karlsruhe, where he succeeded Klaus Theweleit; he held the position until 2017.

Rickels has held visiting appointments at other institutions, including the Eberhard Berent Goethe Chair at New York University in 2018. He has also taught at the European Graduate School in Saas-Fee, Switzerland, where he holds the title of Sigmund Freud Professor of Psychoanalysis; his seminars there have addressed psychoanalysis, media philosophy, science fiction, and horror cinema.

== Research and funding ==
Rickels's research has received support from organizations including the Alexander von Humboldt Foundation, the German Academic Exchange Service (DAAD), and the Center for German and European Studies at the University of California, Berkeley, as well as the Interdisciplinary Humanities Center at UC Santa Barbara and the Zentrum für Literatur- und Kulturforschung in Berlin.

== Intellectual approach and themes ==
Rickels's scholarship combines literary analysis with psychoanalytic theory and media studies, drawing on the work of Sigmund Freud, the Frankfurt School, and postwar German critical theory. Recurring themes in his writing include mourning, trauma, fantasy, and the cultural afterlives of historical events, which he has traced through popular culture including horror films, science fiction, and Cold War media.

Several of his books examine the relationship between fantasy and historical memory. In ''The Vampire Lectures'' and ''Germany: A Science Fiction'', he analyzes how the horror and science-fiction genres reflect broader cultural anxieties and political histories.

== Work in art ==
Alongside his academic publications, Rickels has curated exhibitions connected to contemporary art, and his personal art collection was the subject of an exhibition, A Point of View: Selected Gifts from the Laurence A. Rickels Collection, at the Museum of Contemporary Art in Los Angeles.

== Published books ==
(book written as author)

- Aberrations of Mourning: Writing on German Crypts (Wayne State University Press, 1988).
- Der unbetrauerbare Tod (Edition Passagen, 1989).
- The Case of California (Johns Hopkins University Press, 1991; reissued by University of Minnesota Press, 2001).
- The Vampire Lectures (University of Minnesota Press, 1999).
- Nazi Psychoanalysis (3 volumes: ''Only Psychoanalysis Won the War'', ''Crypto-Fetishism'', ''Psy Fi''; University of Minnesota Press, 2002).
- Ulrike Ottinger: The Autobiography of Art Cinema (University of Minnesota Press, 2008).
- The Devil Notebooks (University of Minnesota Press, 2008).
- I Think I Am Philip K. Dick (University of Minnesota Press, 2010).
- Geprüfte Seelen (Passagen Verlag, 2012).
- SPECTRE (Anti-Oedipus Press, 2013).
- Die Unterwelt der Psychoanalyse (Passagen Verlag, 2014).
- Germany: A Science Fiction (Anti-Oedipus Press, 2015).
- Der Integrierte Vampir und was damit zusammenhängt (Passagen Verlag, 2017).

== See also ==
List of psychoanalytical theorists
