= Charles Brenner (mathematician) =

American mathematician

Charles H. Brenner
- Born: March 18, 1945 (age 80); Princeton, New Jersey, U.S.
- Citizenship: United States
- Education: B.S.; Stanford University; 1967; Ph.D.; UCLA; 1984
- Known for: APL implementation; Forensic mathematics
- Scientific career
- Fields: Mathematics; Computer science; Genetic testing
- Institutions: University of California, Berkeley
- Thesis: Asymptotics of Partition Functions (1984)
- Doctoral advisors: Basil Gordon; Ernst Straus
- Website: dna-view.com

Charles Hallam Brenner is an American mathematician who is the originator of forensic mathematics. His father Joel Lee Brenner was a professor of mathematics and his mother Frances Hallam Brenner was a city councilor and briefly mayor of Palo Alto, California. His uncle Charles Brenner, MD was a psychiatrist.

Brenner received a B.S. from Stanford University in 1967, and a Ph.D. from the University of California, Los Angeles (UCLA) in 1984.

Brenner participated in the implementation of APL\360 and APL\1130, and implemented the transpose and rotate primitive functions.

More recently, Brenner specializes in the use of mathematics in DNA analysis. His principal areas of interest and achievement in the mathematics of forensic DNA are kinship, rare haplotype matching, and DNA mixtures. In a couple of Y haplotype papers, most recently, he showed why Y haplotypes must be much rarer, and how much rarer, than their sample frequency in a reference population sample. Brenner’s Symbolic Kinship Program, which can for example assess the identification evidence based on DNA profiles from an anonymous body and an arbitrary set of presumed relatives, has been widely used in mass victim identification projects, including identifying about 1/3 of the identified World Trade Center bodies.

Brenner played a key role in the resolution of the Larry Hillblom inheritance case, resulting in four Amerasian children each receiving $50 million.

== Anecdotes ==
- Between 1968 and 1973, Brenner lived in London, U.K. and supported himself by playing contract bridge professionally.
- Brenner asked Gordon, his advisor, “How far can you get in mathematics without being smart?”
  “Quite far,” he said.
