= Alloplastic adaptation =

Alloplastic adaptation (from the Greek word "allos", meaning "other") is a form of adaptation where the subject attempts to change the environment when faced with a difficult situation. Criminality, mental illness, and activism can all be classified as categories of alloplastic adaptation.

The concept of alloplastic adaptation was developed by Sigmund Freud, Sándor Ferenczi, and Franz Alexander. They proposed that when an individual was presented with a stressful situation, he could react in one of two ways:

- Autoplastic adaptation: The subject tries to change himself, i.e. the internal environment.
- Alloplastic adaptation: The subject tries to change the situation, i.e. the external environment.

== Origins and development ==
'These terms are possibly due to Ferenczi, who used them in a paper on "The Phenomenon of Hysterical Materialization" (1919,24). But he there appears to attribute them to Freud' (who may have used them previously in private correspondence or conversation). Ferenczi linked 'the purely "autoplastic" tricks of the hysteric...[to] the bodily performances of "artists" and actors'.

Freud's only public use of the terms was in his paper "The Loss of Reality in Neurosis and Psychosis" (1924), where he points out that 'expedient, normal behaviour leads to work being carried out on the external world; it does not stop, as in psychosis, at effecting internal changes. It is no longer autoplastic but alloplastic '.

A few years later, in his paper on "The Neurotic Character" (1930), Alexander described 'a type of neurosis in which...the patient's entire life consists of actions not adapted to reality but rather aimed at relieving unconscious tensions'. Alexander considered that 'neurotic characters of this type are more easily accessible to psychoanalysis than patients with symptom neuroses...[due] to the fact that in the latter the patient has regressed from alloplasticity to autoplasticity; after successful analysis he must pluck up courage to take action in real life'.

Otto Fenichel however took issue with Alexander on this point, maintaining that 'The pseudo-alloplastic attitude of the neurotic character cannot be changed into a healthy alloplastic one except by first being transformed, for a time, into a neurotic autoplastic attitude, which can then be treated like an ordinary symptom neurosis'.

== Human evolution ==
Alloplasticity has also been used to describe humanity's cultural "evolution". Man's 'evolution by culture...is through alloplastic experiment with objects outside his own body....Unlike autoplastic experiments, alloplastic ones are both replicable and reversible'.

In particular, 'advanced technological societies...are generally characterized by "alloplastic" relations with the environment, involving the manipulation of the environment itself'.

== See also ==
- Gamification
- Unholy alliance
