= Libidinal Types =

Freud's short article Libidinal types was published in German in 1931 as Über libidinöse Typen. English translations followed in 1932, both as the lead article in the first volume of The Psychoanalytic Quarterly, and in the International Journal of Psycho-Analysis. It describes a set of seven normal personality types that are derived from three main types that he considered to be normal, rather than pathological.

== The Typology ==
The types are conceptually aligned with Freud's earlier work in character types, but are based on Freud's later, structural view of the mind. "According, then, as the libido is predominantly allocated to the provinces of mental apparatus, we can distinguish three main libidinal types. To give names to these types is not particularly easy; following our depth-psychology, I should like to call them the erotic, the narcissistic, and the obsessional types." While this was published as a journal article, it may also be considered as a further development of an idea Freud introduced in Civilization and Its Discontents. "Happiness... is a problem of the economics of the individual's libido... The man is who predominantly erotic will give first preference to his emotional relationships to other people; the narcissistic... man of action will never give up the external world on which he can try out his strength."

=== Three Main Types ===
The Erotic type describes people whose libido is predominantly aimed at love. Loving others, being loved, and the fear of loss of love. It represents the strong demands of the id.

The Obsessional type describes people whose personalities are dominated by the super-ego. They fear their conscience, rather than a loss of love. They are self-reliant and conservative. (In the original 1932 English translation by Edith Jackson, this was called the compulsive type.)

The Narcissistic type describes people whose main interest is self-preservation and have no tension between the ego and super-ego. They can be aggressive and not easily intimidated.

=== Four Mixed Types ===
Freud claimed that mixed types were far more common than unmixed types, and introduced these mixed names for the first time in this article.

The Erotic-Obsessional individuals' super-ego restricts their instincts. They are the most likely to be dependent on other people and guided by memories of significant others, such as parents and teachers.

The Erotic-Narcissistic personality type, which Freud believed was the most common, moderates the tension between opposites.

The Narcissistic-Obsessional type strengthens the ego against the super-ego. Freud claimed this type was the most valuable culturally, because their aggressive energy is checked by conscience.

Freud then claimed that the roughly equal mixture of all three main types, the Erotic-Obsessional-Narcissistic type, was the absolute normal and ideal harmony, but did not elaborate any specific traits or characteristics for this type.

=== Validation ===
A study by Tim Scudder provided “…the first empirical support for the validity of Freud’s libidinal typology. Each of the seven types can be distinguished from the population, and the blended types can be distinguished from the components of their respective blends.” The frequencies of all seven types in this study population (n=9,798) matched the frequency claims made by both Freud and Fromm, such as Freud's claim that the mixed types were more common than the main types, and Fromm's claim that the erotic blended more frequently with the narcissistic, than the obsessional.

=== Relation of Libidinal Types to Pathology ===
Toward the end of the article, Freud indicated that all the libidinal types could exist without pathology, and speculated about how normal people of different types might develop neurosis, and that extreme forms of the main types were more likely to develop neurosis than the blended types. He suggested that the erotic types would develop hysteria when they were ill, and that the obsessional types would develop obsessional neurosis, and that the narcissistic types, when frustrated, were prone to psychosis and potentially to criminality.

== Subsequent Development of the Typology ==
Erich Fromm, Elias Porter, and Michael Maccoby each built on elements of the libidinal types in their work. Fromm's developments were focused on four non-productive personality types, Porter's set of seven normal types aligned with Freud's, and Maccoby focused on the application of the types in the context of leadership. The types align conceptually as presented in the table below.

Freud's Libidinal Types	Fromm's Non-Productive Orientations	Porter's Motivational Value Systems	Maccoby's Leadership Types
Erotic	Receptive	Altruistic-Nurturing	Caring
Obsessional	Hoarding	Analytic-Autonomizing	Systematic
Narcissistic	Exploitative	Assertive-Directing	Visionary
Erotic-Obsessional-Narcissistic	Marketing	Flexible-Cohering	Adaptive
Erotic-Obsessional	Blend	Cautious-Supporting	Blend
Erotic-Narcissistic	Blend	Assertive-Nurturing	Blend
Narcissistic-Obsessional	Blend	Judicious-Competing	Blend

For Fromm, the "fundamental basis of character is not seen in various types of libido organization, but in specific kinds of a person's relatedness to the world." Fromm focused on the non-productive aspects of his typology, while positing a single productive orientation. The receptive, hoarding, and exploitative orientations aligned, respectively, with the erotic, obsessional, and narcissistic types.

According to Maccoby, "The usefulness of both Freud's and Fromm's types has been limited by the negative terms that made people feel judged. Elias Porter took Fromm's types, termed them motivational systems, and made them more accessible for people to use by emphasizing their positive qualities." In Porter's typology, the erotic became altruistic-nurturing, the obsessional became analytic-autonomizing, and the narcissistic became assertive-directing.

Maccoby outlined Freud's three main personality types in a Harvard Business Review article, which was then developed into the book Narcissistic Leaders where he outlined the strengths and weaknesses of leaders with each main personality type, however, with an emphasis on the value and associated risks of following (or being) a narcissist. He further developed the types with an emphasis on productive leadership personalities and renamed them caring, systematic, visionary, and adaptive.
