= Olga Zilboorg =

Mexican-American musician (1933–2017)

- Olga Zilboorg, from a 2017 publication
- Born: June 30, 1933; Mexico City, Mexico
- Died: April 22, 2017 (aged 83); Port Jefferson, New York, U.S.
- Other names: Olga Z. Irvine
- Occupations: Cellist, music educator

Olga Zilboorg (June 30, 1933 – April 22, 2017) was an American cellist and music educator, born in Mexico City. She was a founding member of the North Shore Pro Musica chamber ensemble, and a longtime cello teacher on Long Island.

== Early life ==
Olga Zilboorg was born and raised in Mexico City, one of the three daughters of James M. Zilboorg and Eugenia Helfman Zilboorg. Her parents were Jewish immigrants to the United States, originally from Kyiv; her father was an industrial engineer. Her uncle was psychoanalyst Gregory Zilboorg. She began her cello studies in Mexico with the Hungarian refugee Imre Hartmann (a member of the Léner Quartet). She attended the University of Kansas (where her teacher was Raymond Stuhl) and the Manhattan School of Music, where she was a student of Bernard Greenhouse. She pursued further studies in Italy with André Navarra and composer Luigi Dallapiccola. While at Kansas, she won the Naftzger Award, which offered a cash prize from a promising young artist and a guest solo with the Wichita Symphony.

== Career ==
"Miss Zilboorg's tone is full and appealing, particularly in the romantic, lyrical parts," commented one reporter in 1954. After graduating from the Manhattan School in 1957 she joined the St. Louis Symphony, as one its first woman members. While in St. Louis she toured the United States with the St. Louis Trio. In 1959, she competed in the Pablo Casals Second International Cello Contest. In 1962 she left the St. Louis Symphony to pursue a solo career. In that year she was a contestant in the Second International Tchaikovsky Contest. In 1962–1963 she gave debut recitals at the Wigmore Hall in London, the Brahms-Saal at the Musikverein in Vienna and Carnegie Recital Hall in New York. In these concerts and later in her career she championed Dallapiccola's Ciaccona, Intermezzo e Adagio (1945) for solo cello. She was in the pit orchestra for the original Broadway run of Hello, Dolly! in 1964. After 1965 she devoted much of her time to teaching cello privately on Long Island, later joining the faculty of the Stony Brook University Pre-College Music Program. She was a founding member of North Shore Pro Musica chamber ensemble in 1981, and performed with the Long Island Philharmonic. In 2009, she was honored with a resolution in the New York State Senate, recognizing her as "recipient of the Visual and Performing Arts Award by the Town of Brookhaven Office of Women's Services."

== Personal life ==
Olga Zilboorg married Stony Brook University engineering professor Thomas F. Irvine Jr. in 1965. The Irvines had a daughter, Tatiana Irvine, and a son, Thomas A. Irvine, who is a music academic at the University of Southampton in the UK. Olga Zilboorg died in 2017, aged 83 years. Some of her family correspondence is in the James and Eugenia Zilboorg papers at Yale University.
