= Fritz Redl =

Austrian psychoanalyst (1902–1988)

Fritz Redl (9 September 1902 – 9 February 1988) was an Austrian-American child psychoanalyst and educator who was born in Klaus near Schladming and died in North Adams, Massachusetts.

== Career ==
Fritz Redl was born in Klaus, Austria. He witnessed his mother burn to death due to an accident in the kitchen when he was a small child. Redl spent most of his childhood and youth in Vienna. Redl came into contact with the progressive educational methods of the Austrian Montessori movement, possibly through participating in the Wandervogel. He decided to study philosophy. After completing his doctorate on the epistemological principles of Kant's ethics, Redl trained as a psychoanalyst under the influence of August Aichhorn and Anna Freud. During the decade that followed he completed training in psychoanalysis at the Vienna Psychoanalytic Institute.

While in Vienna he met Gina Weinmann, possibly because both were in analysis with Richard Sterba or possibly because both were involved with the psychoanalytically oriented Montessori movement in Vienna.

He and Weinmann ran a summer camp for disturbed children in the Austrian countryside. Weinmann's first husband, Bruno Bettelheim, secured them the place to hold this camp through connections he had through the lumber business he ran with Mr. Schnitzler.

Redl's dual focus on the education and socialization of children, and on psychoanalytic models of understanding personality development and of the treatment of children, helped specialize his work throughout his career.

In 1936 he moved to the United States where he was invited by the Rockefeller Foundation to participate in a project about adolescence. While in New York he met George Sheviakov with whom he became friends.

After leaving the Rockefeller Foundation he worked at the University of Michigan at Wayne State. While there he frequently drove to Chicago where he visited the Sheviakovs and Bettelheims. Redl and Bruno Bettelheim|Bruno influenced each other as both were developing their ideas about milieu therapy.

Following his Wayne State years he moved to Washington, DC where he had a position at the National Institute of Mental Health. He was elected president of the American Orthopsychiatric Association. He retired in 1973 and moved, with his wife to North Adams, MA where he died after several strokes.

His first two publications (1933–34, in German) — on learning difficulties and exam phobias — were followed by an influential article on "Group Formation and Leadership" published in Psychiatry in 1942. There he explored the role of what he called the "central person" in group dynamics, singling out ten main types of central figures, ranging from the hero or the tyrant, to the good influence or the bad example.

His interest in group dynamics extended into his work with disturbed children, where he developed the concept of the Life Space Interview, as a means of crisis intervention in the life of the troubled child. To help disturbed troubled youth, he suggested the importance of creating a life space that would nurture and inspire positive relationships. He proposed that this be done by structured, engaging activities and by the use of language. Redl also explored the role of behavioral contagion in promoting regression in children, and how close attention to the child's milieu could help enhance behavioral control. His work with groups, summer camps and residential care came together in the residential setting of Pioneer House.

== Selected publications ==
- The Aggressive Child (1957)
- When We Deal with Children (1966)

== See also ==
- Bruno Bettelheim
- Ego psychology
- Milieu therapy
- Psychoanalytic criminology
- Role suction
- T-groups
