= Déformation professionnelle =

Cognitive biases associated with occupations

Déformation professionnelle (French: [defɔʁmasjɔ̃ pʁɔfɛsjɔnɛl], 'professional deformation' or 'job conditioning') is a tendency to look at things from the point of view of one's own profession or special expertise rather than from a broader or humane perspective. It is often translated as professional deformation, although French déformation can also be translated as distortion. The implication is that professional training, and its related socialization, often result in a distortion of the way one views the world. The Nobel laureate Alexis Carrel has observed that "[e]very specialist, owing to a well-known professional bias, believes that he understands the entire human being, while in reality he only grasps a tiny part of him."

== History ==
"Déformation professionnelle" was used in 19th-century medicine to describe a bodily deformity caused by one's occupation. As a term in psychology, it was likely introduced by the Belgian sociologist Daniel Warnotte, or the Russian-American sociologist Pitirim Sorokin. The colloquial term "nerdview" describes a similar tendency.

== See also ==
- Bias blind spot
- Law of the instrument
- Marketing myopia
- Occupational psychosis
