= Dorian Feigenbaum =

Austrian psychoanalyst

Dorian Aryeh Feigenbaum (born May 19, 1887, in Lemberg—now Lviv, then part of Austria-Hungary; died in 1937) was an Austrian psychoanalyst and the co-founder and editor-in-chief of the academic journal The Psychoanalytic Quarterly.

He was graduated in medicine from the University of Vienna in 1914 and studied at the German Institute for Psychiatric Research (German: Deutsche Forschungsanstalt für Psychiatrie) in Munich, under the pioneering psychiatrist Emil Kraepelin.

Feigenbaum served as the director of Esrath Nashim (The Hospital for the Mental Diseases) in Jerusalem and as psychiatric consultant to the Government of Palestine until he was fired by the hospital board in 1924.
