= Jacob Arlow =

American psychologist

- Born: 1912
- Died: 2004 (aged 91–92)
- Occupations: teacher, scholar, clinician
- Known for: president of the American Psychoanalytic Association and the New York Psychoanalytic Institute, editor of the Psychoanalytic Quarterly (1972–1979)
- Notable work: Fantasy Systems in Twins (1960)

Jacob A. Arlow (1912–2004) was an American teacher, scholar, and clinician who served as president of the American Psychoanalytic Association and the New York Psychoanalytic Institute.

Arlow was an editor of the Psychoanalytic Quarterly from 1972 to 1979; and published several articles on psychoanalysis, as well as writing a history of psychoanalytic history, and co-authoring with Charles Brenner the influential text Psychoanalytic Concepts and the Structural Theory.

== Fantasy and myth ==
In perhaps his most significant theoretical contribution to psychoanalysis, Arlow explored the role of unconscious fantasy from the point of view of ego psychology, both subsuming its use in Kleinian theory, and providing the building block for Brenner's later development of conflict theory.

His earlier article on Fantasy Systems in Twins (1960) was used by Maynard Solomon to illuminate the inner development of Beethoven, Arlow observing that the “bond of complete understanding which is missing with the parent unites the twins in the wish fantasy....The existence of another individual who is a reflection of the self brings the experience of twinship in line with the psychology of the double”.

He also explored the role of myth in bridging the gap between individual instinctual conflicts and cultural ideals.

== Psychoanalyitc limitations ==
Arlow insisted on the limitations of psychoanalysis, inherent both in its technique and in the human experience itself, and warned against any quest for perfection through psychoanalysis.

== Criticism ==
Heinz Kohut in his self psychology would challenge the Arlow/Brenner belief that narcissistic personality disorder could be understood within the methodology of the transference neurosis.

== See also ==
- Character perversion
- Fantasy
- Janine Chasseguet-Smirgel
- Object relations theory
- Robert C. Bak
- Robert Langs
