= Janet Malcolm =

American journalist (1934–2021)

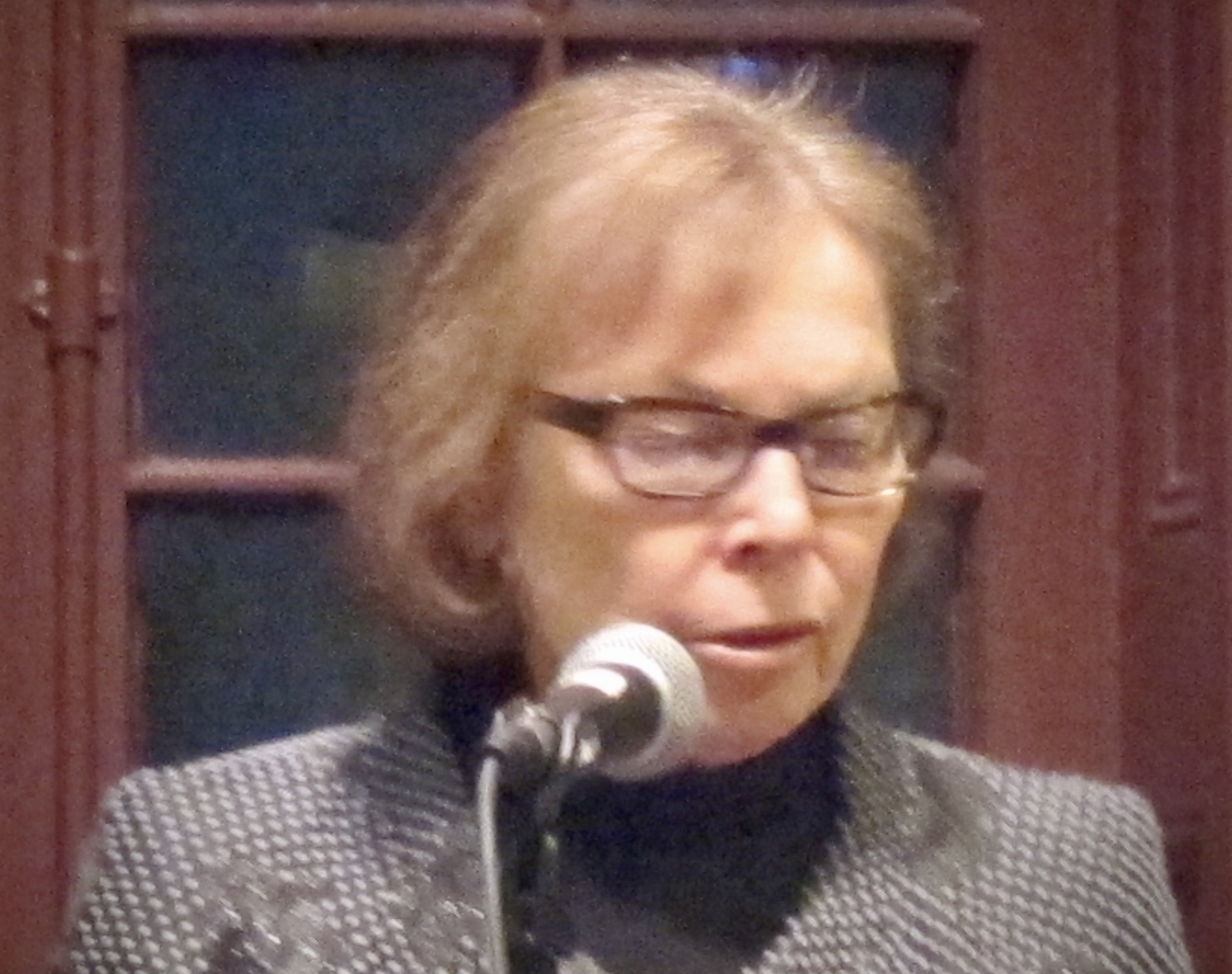
- Malcolm in 2013
- Born: Jana Klara Wienerová; July 8, 1934; Prague, Czechoslovakia
- Died: June 16, 2021 (aged 86); New York City, U.S.
- Education: University of Michigan
- Occupations: Writer; journalist; collagist
- Spouses: Donald Malcolm (m. 1953; death 1975) Gardner Botsford (m. 1975; death 2004)
- Children: 1
- Relatives: Marie Winn (sister)
- Writing career
- Notable work: The Journalist and the Murderer (1990)
- Notable awards: American Academy of Arts and Letters, 2001

Janet Clara Malcolm (born Jana Klara Wienerová; July 8, 1934 – June 16, 2021) was an American writer, staff journalist at The New Yorker magazine, and collagist who fled antisemitic persecution in Nazi-occupied Prague. She was the author of Psychoanalysis: The Impossible Profession (1981), In the Freud Archives (1984), and The Journalist and the Murderer (1990). Malcolm wrote frequently about psychoanalysis and explored the relationship between journalist and subject. She was known for her prose style and for polarizing criticism of her profession, especially in her most contentious work, The Journalist and the Murderer, which has become a staple of journalism-school curricula.

== Early life ==
Malcolm was born in Prague in 1934, one of two daughters (the other is the author Marie Winn), of Hanna (née Taussig) and Josef Wiener (aka Joseph A. Winn), a psychiatrist. She resided in New York City after her Jewish family emigrated from Czechoslovakia in 1939, fleeing Nazi persecution of Jews. Malcolm was educated at the High School of Music and Art, and then at the University of Michigan, where she wrote for the campus newspaper, The Michigan Daily, and the humor magazine, The Gargoyle, later editing The Gargoyle.

== Career ==
Malcolm was a literary nonfiction writer known for her prose style and her examination of the relationship between journalist and subject. She began working at The New Yorker in 1963 with women's interest assignments, writing about holiday shopping and children's books, as well as a column on home decor. She next wrote about photography for the magazine. She moved to reporting in 1978, which Malcolm attributed to her smoking cessation in a 2011 profile by Katie Roiphe: "She began to do the dense, idiosyncratic writing she is now known for when she quit smoking in 1978: she couldn't write without cigarettes, so she began reporting a long New Yorker fact piece, on family therapy, called 'The One-Way Mirror.'"

Her preference for writing in the first person was influenced by New Yorker colleague Joseph Mitchell, and she developed an interest in the construction of the auctorial subject as much as the objects it described, quickly realizing "this 'I' was a character, just like the other characters. It's a construct. And it's not the person who you are. There's a bit of you in it. But it's a creation. Somewhere I wrote, 'the distinction between the I of the writing and the I of your life is like Superman and Clark Kent.'" She turned this interest in the construction of narrative to a variety of subjects, including two books about couples (Gertrude Stein and Alice B. Toklas, and poets Sylvia Plath and Ted Hughes), one on Anton Chekhov, and another on the true crime genre. In a number of works, she returned repeatedly to the subject of psychoanalysis.

Malcolm was elected to the American Academy of Arts and Letters in 2001. Her papers are held at the Beinecke Rare Book & Manuscript Library at Yale University, which acquired her archive in 2013.

=== Psychoanalysis: The Impossible Profession ===
In 1981, Malcolm published a book on the modern psychoanalytic profession, following a psychoanalyst she gave the pseudonym “Aaron Green”. Freud scholar Peter Gay wrote that Malcolm's "witty and wicked Psychoanalysis: The Impossible Profession has been praised by psychoanalysts (with justice) as a dependable introduction to analytic theory and technique. It has the rare advantage over more solemn texts of being funny as well as informative".

In his 1981 New York Times review, Joseph Edelson wrote that Psychoanalysis: The Impossible Profession "is an artful book", praising Malcolm’s "keen eye for the surfaces — clothing, speech and furniture — that express character and social role" (noting she was then the photography critic for The New Yorker). It succeeds because she has instructed herself so carefully in the technical literature. Above all, it succeeds because she has been able to engage Aaron Green in a simulacrum of the psychoanalytic encounter — he confessing to her, she (I suspect) to him, the two of them joined in an intricate minuet of revelation."

The book was a 1982 National Book Award for Nonfiction finalist.

=== In the Freud Archives and the Masson case ===
Articles Malcolm published in The New Yorker and in her subsequent book In The Freud Archives (1984) offered, according to the book's dust jacket, "the narrative of an unlikely, tragic/comic encounter among three men." They were psychoanalyst Kurt R. Eissler, psychoanalyst Jeffrey Moussaieff Masson, and independent Freud scholar Peter J. Swales. The book triggered a legal challenge by Masson, the former project director for the Sigmund Freud Archives. In his 1984 lawsuit, Masson claimed that Malcolm had libeled him by fabricating quotations she attributed to him.

In August 1989, United States Court of Appeals for the Ninth Circuit in San Francisco agreed with a lower court in dismissing without full trial a libel lawsuit that Masson had filed against Malcolm, The New Yorker and Alfred A. Knopf.

Malcolm claimed that Masson had called himself an "intellectual gigolo". She also claimed that he said he wanted to turn the Freud estate into a haven of "sex, women, and fun" and claimed that he was, "after Freud, the greatest analyst that ever lived." Malcolm was unable to produce all the disputed material on tape. Masson then appealed to the Supreme Court, which held that the case could go forward for trial by jury to decide whether what Malcolm had written was true and, if not, whether any untruths had been malicious.

A first jury deadlocked in 1993, and a second jury decided in Malcolm's favor on November 2, 1994. Masson appealed, and the 9th circuit again ruled in Malcolm's favor in 1996, at which point Masson ended the litigation.

In August 1995, Malcolm said that she had discovered a misplaced notebook containing three of the disputed quotes, swearing "an affidavit under penalty of perjury that the notes were genuine."

=== The Journalist and the Murderer ===
"Every journalist who is not too stupid or too full of himself to notice what is going on knows that what he does is morally indefensible."

— Janet Malcolm, 1990

Malcolm's 1990 book The Journalist and the Murderer begins with the statement: "Every journalist who is not too stupid or too full of himself to notice what is going on knows that what he does is morally indefensible."

Her book is about the popular nonfiction writer Joe McGinniss's writing his true crime book Fatal Vision. When McGinniss wrote it, he lived with the defense team of doctor Jeffrey MacDonald while MacDonald was on trial for the murders of his two daughters and pregnant wife. In Malcolm's reporting, McGinniss quickly arrived at the conclusion that MacDonald was guilty, but feigned belief in his innocence to gain MacDonald's trust and access to the story—ultimately being sued by MacDonald over the deception.

Malcolm's book created a sensation when in March 1989 it appeared in two parts in The New Yorker magazine. Roundly criticized upon first publication, the book is still controversial, although it has come to be regarded as a classic, routinely assigned to journalism students. It ranks ninety-seventh in The Modern Library's list of the twentieth century's "100 Best Works of Nonfiction". Douglas McCollum wrote in the Columbia Journalism Review, "In the decade after Malcolm's essay appeared, her once controversial theory became received wisdom."

=== Further books ===
In the posthumously published Still Pictures: On Photography and Memory, Malcolm writes autobiographical sketches, starting the chapters from family photographs.

== Reception ==
Malcolm's penchant for controversial subjects and tendency to insert her views into the narrative brought her both admirers and critics. "Leaning heavily on the techniques of psychoanalysis, she probes not only actions and reactions but motivations and intent; she pursues literary analysis like a crime drama and courtroom battles like novels," wrote Cara Parks in The New Republic in April 2013. Parks praised Malcolm's "intensely intellectual style" as well as her "sharpness and creativity."

In Esquire magazine, Tom Junod characterized Malcolm as "a self-hater whose work has managed to speak for the self-hatred (not to mention the class issues) of a profession that has designs on being 'one of the professions' but never will be." Junod found her to be devoid of "journalistic sympathy" and observed: "Very few journalists are more animated by malice than Janet Malcolm.” Junod himself, however, has been criticized for a number of journalistic duplicities, including a smirking piece in Esquire which outed the actor Kevin Spacey, as well as a similarly homophobic faux profile of the singer Michael Stipe.

Katie Roiphe summarized the tension between these polarized views, writing in 2011: "Malcolm's work, then, occupies that strange glittering territory between controversy and the establishment: she is both a grande dame of journalism, and still, somehow, its enfant terrible."

Charles Finch wrote in 2023 "it seems safe to say that the two most important long-form journalists this country produced in the second half of the last century were Joan Didion and Janet Malcolm."

== Personal life ==
Malcolm met her first husband, Donald Malcolm, at the University of Michigan. In 1953 the pair married while still enrolled as students. After graduation, they moved to Washington, D.C., where Malcolm occasionally reviewed books for The New Republic before returning to New York. Donald reviewed books for The New Yorker in the 1950s and 1960s and served as a theater critic. They had a daughter, Anne, in 1963. The pair separated and Donald Malcolm died in 1975.

Malcolm's second husband was long-time New Yorker editor Gardner Botsford, a member of the family that had originally funded The New Yorker. They married in 1975. The author of A Life of Privilege, Mostly: A Memoir, Botsford died at the age of 87 in September 2004.

== Death ==
On June 16, 2021, Janet Malcolm died of lung cancer at the age of 86 at a Manhattan hospital.

== Works ==
=== Long-form non-fiction ===
- Malcolm, Janet (1981). Psychoanalysis: The Impossible Profession. Jason Aronson. ISBN 978-1-56821-342-2.
- — (1984). In the Freud Archives. Alfred A. Knopf. ISBN 0394538692. Reissued in 2002 with an afterword by Janet Malcolm by New York Review Books. ISBN 9781590170274
- — (1990). The Journalist and the Murderer. Alfred A. Knopf. ISBN 978-0-394-58312-9.
- — (1994). The Silent Woman: Sylvia Plath and Ted Hughes. Alfred A. Knopf. ISBN 978-0-679-43158-9.
- — (1999). The Crime of Sheila McGough. Alfred A. Knopf. ISBN 978-0-375-40508-2.
- — (2001). Reading Chekhov: A Critical Journey. Random House. ISBN 0-375-50668-3.
- — (2007). Two Lives: Gertrude and Alice. Yale University Press. ISBN 978-0-300-13771-2.
- — (2011). Iphigenia in Forest Hills: Anatomy of a Murder Trial. Yale University Press. ISBN 978-0-300-16883-9.
- — (2023). Still Pictures: On Photography and Memory. Farrar, Straus and Giroux. ISBN 978-0-374-60513-1.

=== Essay collections ===
- — (1980). Diana & Nikon: Essays on the Aesthetic of Photography. D. R. Godine. ISBN 978-0-87923-273-3.
  - — (1997). Diana & Nikon: Essays on Photography – Expanded Edition. Aperture. ISBN 978-0-89381-727-5.
- — (1992). The Purloined Clinic: Selected Writings. Knopf. ISBN 978-0-679-41232-8.
- — (2013). Forty-one False Starts: Essays on Artists and Writers. Farrar, Straus and Giroux. ISBN 978-0-374-15769-2.
- — (2019). Nobody's Looking at You: Essays. Farrar, Straus and Giroux. ISBN 978-0-374-27949-3.

=== Photography ===
- — (2008). Burdock. Yale University Press. ISBN 978-0-300-12861-1.

=== As editor ===
- Chekhov, Anton (2018). The Lady with the Little Dog and Other Stories. Translated by Constance Garnett; selected, with a preface by Janet Malcolm. riverrun.
- — (2020). The Duel and other stories. Translated by Constance Garnett; selected, with a preface by Janet Malcolm. riverrun.
- — (2020). Ward No. 6 and other stories. Translated by Constance Garnett; selected, with a preface by Janet Malcolm. riverrun.

== Awards and honors ==
- 1982 – National Book Award for Nonfiction finalist for Psychoanalysis: The Impossible Profession
- 2001 – election to the American Academy of Arts and Letters
- 2008 – PEN/Jacqueline Bograd Weld Award for Biography for Two Lives: Gertrude and Alice
- 2008 – Stonewall Honor Book in Non-Fiction for Two Lives: Gertrude and Alice
- 2013 – National Book Critics Circle Award (Criticism) shortlist for Forty-One False Starts
- 2017 – American Academy of Arts and Letters Gold Medal for Belles Lettres and Criticism
