= Gregory Zilboorg =

Ukrainian psychoanalyst and historian of psychiatry (1890–1959)

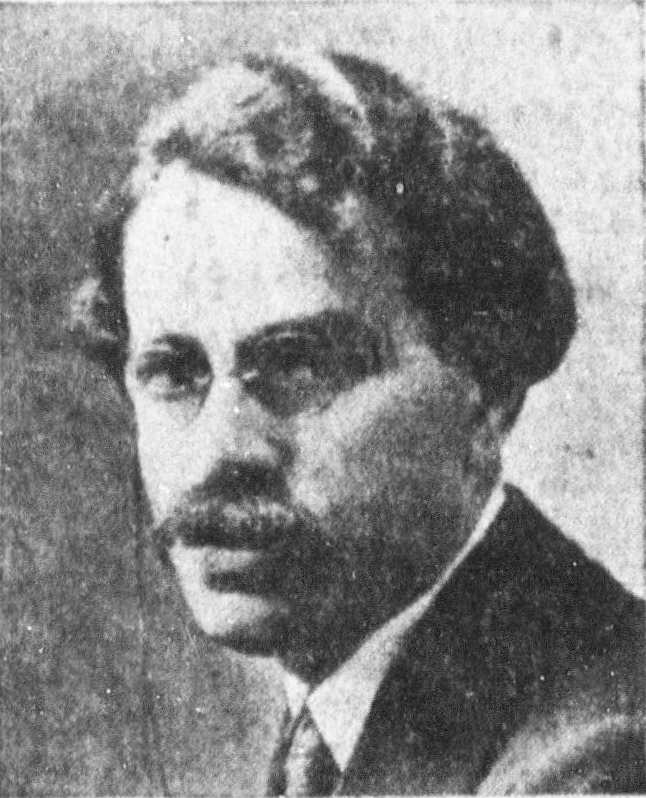
Gregory Zilboorg

Gregory Zilboorg (Russian: Григорий Зильбург, Ukrainian: Григорій Зільбург) (December 25, 1890 – September 17, 1959) was a psychoanalyst and historian of psychiatry who is remembered for situating psychiatry within a broad sociological and humanistic context in his many writings and lectures.

== Life and career ==
Zilboorg was born into a Jewish family in Kyiv, Ukraine on December 25, 1890, and studied medicine in St. Petersburg, where he worked under Vladimir Bekhterev. In 1917, after the February Revolution, he served as secretary to the Ministry of Labor under two prime ministers (Aleksandr Kerenskii and Georgii L'vov). When the Bolsheviks came to power, he fled to Kyiv and established a reputation as a political journalist and drama critic.

Zilboorg emigrated to the United States in 1919 and supported himself by lecturing on the Chautauqua circuit and translating literature from Russian to English. Among the works he translated is Evgenii Zamiatin's novel We and Leonid Andreyev's 1915 play He Who Gets Slapped. Well received, that translation has been republished 17 times since that initial publication. In 1922 he began studying for his second medical degree, at Columbia University.

After graduating in 1926, he worked at the Bloomingdale Hospital and in 1931 began his psychoanalytic practice in New York City, having first been analysed in Berlin by Franz Alexander. From the 1930s onward, Zilboorg produced several volumes of lasting importance on the history of psychiatry. The Medical Man and the Witch During the Renaissance began as the Noguchi lectures at Johns Hopkins University in 1935. This volume was followed by A History of Medical Psychology in 1941 and Sigmund Freud in 1951. He also produced a series of clinical articles on subjects from the schizoid personality to postpartum depression – he considered the latter as rooted in ambivalence over motherhood and latent sadism – and explored the effects of unresolved conflicts and countertransference effects of the analyst in the analytic situation.

Zilboorg's patients included George Gershwin, Lillian Hellman, Ralph Ingersoll, Edward M. M. Warburg, Marshall Field, Kay Swift and James Warburg. The musical Lady in the Dark is reportedly based on Moss Hart's experience of analysis with Zilboorg, who also examined other noted writers including Thomas Merton.

Zilboorg married Ray Liebow in 1919, and they had two children (Nancy and Gregory Jr.). He married Margaret Stone in 1946, and they had three children (Caroline, John and Matthew). His niece was cellist Olga Zilboorg.

According to both Susan Quinn, and Ron Chernow, Zilboorg sometimes engaged in unethical behavior, including financial exploitation of his patients. In an interview with Chernow, Edward M. M. Warburg reported that Zilboorg asked him for cash gifts and, in one instance, a mink coat for his wife. A biography written by his daughter, The Life of Gregory Zilboorg (see further reading below), recounts in detail Zilboorg's spiritual journey, his friendship with the Dominican Noël Mailloux, and his eventual conversion to Roman Catholicism.

== Literary archives ==
Zilboorg's papers at the Beinecke Rare Book and Manuscript Library, Yale University, contain manuscripts of several of his publications as well as his personal correspondence with Margaret Stone Zilboorg.

== Bibliography ==
=== Writings ===
- The passing of the old order in Europe (1920)
- The medical man and the witch during the renaissance (1935)
- A history of medical psychology (1941)
- Mind, Medicine, & Man (1943)
- Sigmund Freud (1951)
- Psychology of the criminal act and punishment (1954)
- Psychoanalysis and Religion (1962)

=== Translations ===
- He Who Gets Slapped by Leonid Andreyev, translated from the Russian with an introduction (1921)
- We by Yevgeny Zamyatin, translated from the Russian (1924)
- The criminal, the judge and the public; a psychological analysis by Franz Alexander and Hugo Staub, translated from the German (1931)
- Outline of clinical psychoanalysis by Otto Fenichel, translated by Bertram D. Lewin and Gregory Zilboorg (1934)

== See also ==
- Bertram D. Lewin
- Grandiosity
- Karl Stern
- Psychoanalytic Quarterly
- Thomas Merton
