= Franz Alexander =

Hungarian-American psychoanalyst

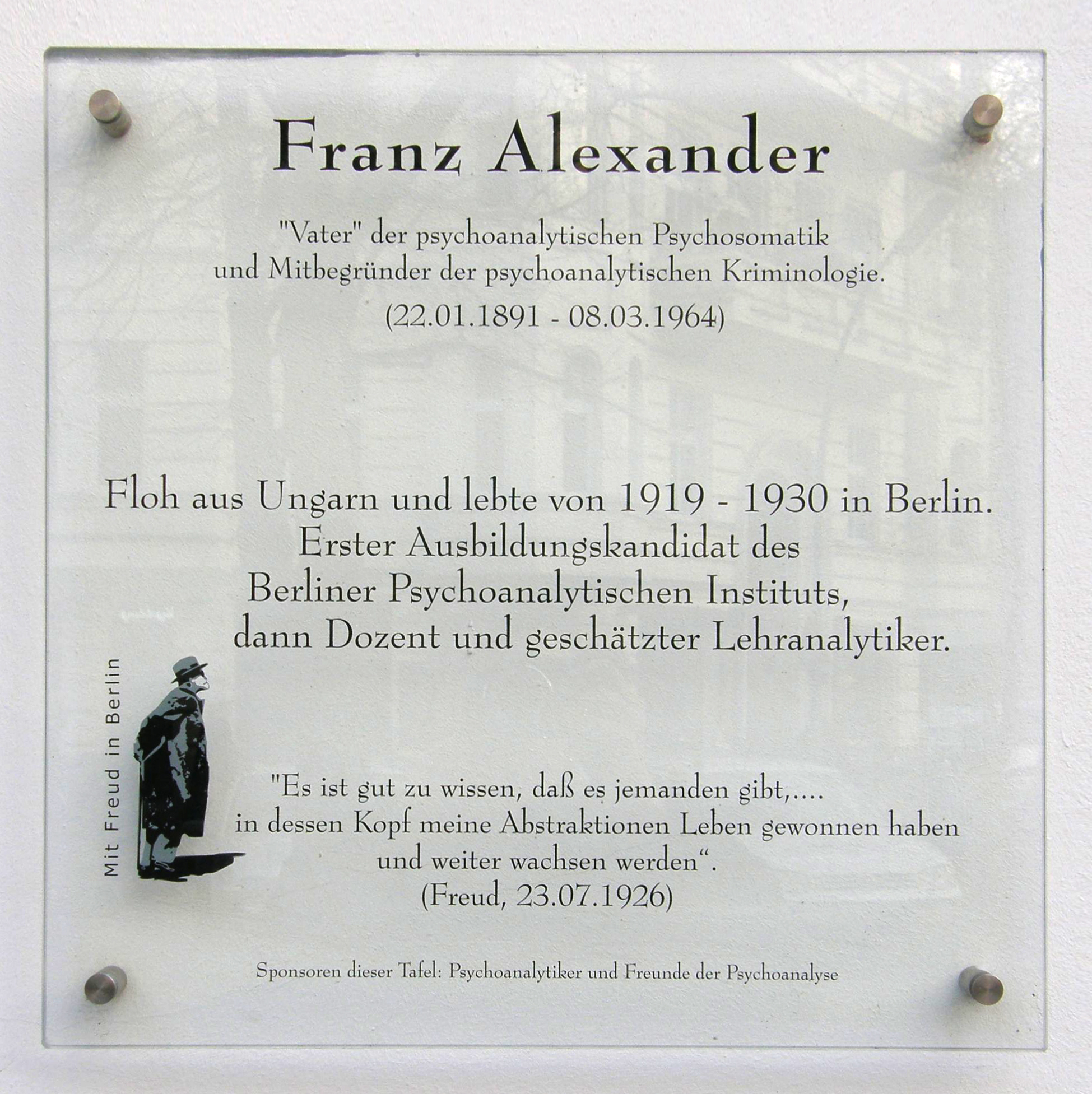
- Memorial in the Ludwigkirchstraße, Berlin
- Born: Alexander Ferenc Gábor; 22 January 1891; Budapest, Austria-Hungary
- Died: 8 March 1964 (aged 73); Palm Springs, California, U.S.
- Known for: Psychosomatic medicine Psychoanalytic criminology
- Scientific career
- Fields: Psychoanalysis

Franz Gabriel Alexander (Austrian German: [frants ˈɡaːbri̯eːl ˈalɛksandɐ]; born Alexander Ferenc Gábor, Hungarian: [ˈɒlɛksɒndɒr ˈfɛrɛnts ˈɡaːbor]; 22 January 1891 – 8 March 1964) was a Hungarian-American psychoanalyst and physician, who is considered one of the founders of psychosomatic medicine and psychoanalytic criminology.

== Life ==
Alexander was born into a Jewish family in Budapest, Austria-Hungary, in 1891, his father was Bernhard Alexander, a philosopher and literary critic, his nephew was Alfréd Rényi, a Hungarian mathematician who made contributions in combinatorics, graph theory, number theory but mostly in probability theory. Alexander studied in Berlin; there he was part of an influential group of German analysts mentored by Karl Abraham, including Karen Horney and Helene Deutsch, and gathered around the Berlin Psychoanalytic Institute. In the early 1920s, Oliver Freud (Sigmund Freud's son) was in analysis with Franz Alexander, while Charles Odier, one of the first among French psychoanalysts, was analysed in Berlin by Franz Alexander as well.

In 1930, he was invited by Robert Hutchins, then President of the University of Chicago, to become its Visiting Professor of Psychoanalysis. Alexander worked there at the Chicago Institute for Psychoanalysis, where Paul Rosenfels was one of his students. In the 1950s, he was among the first members of the Society for General Systems Research.

Franz Alexander died in Palm Springs, California in 1964.

== Early writings (1923–1943) ==
Alexander was a prolific writer. Between 'The Castration Complex in the Formation of Character [1923] ... [&] Fundamental Concepts of Psychosomatic Research [1943]' he published nearly twenty other articles, contributing on a wide variety of subjects to the work of the "second psychoanalytic generation".

'Alexander in his "vector analysis"... measured the relative participation of the three basic directions in which an organism's tendencies towards the external world may be effective: reception, elimination, and retention'. In this he may have been a forerunner to Erik H. Erikson's later exploration of 'Zones, Modes, and Modalities'.

He also explored the 'morality demanded by the archaic superego ... an automatized pseudo morality, characterized by Alexander as the corruptibility of the superego'.

Notable too was his exploration of acting out in real life, 'in which the patient's entire life consists of actions not adapted to reality but rather aimed at relieving unconscious tensions. It was this type of neurosis that was first described by Alexander under the name of neurotic character'.

== Psychosomatic work and short-term psychotherapy ==
Franz Alexander led the movement looking for the dynamic interrelation between mind and body. Sigmund Freud pursued a deep interest in psychosomatic illnesses following his correspondence with Georg Groddeck who was, at the time, researching the possibility of treating physical disorders through psychological processes.

Together with Freud and Sándor Ferenczi, Alexander developed the concept of autoplastic adaptation. They proposed that when an individual was presented with a stressful situation, he could react in one of two ways:

- Autoplastic adaptation: The subject tries to change himself, i.e., the internal environment.
- Alloplastic adaptation: The subject tries to change the situation, i.e., the external environment.

From the 1930s through the 1950s, numerous analysts were engaged with the question of how to shorten the course of therapy but still achieve therapeutic effectiveness. These included Alexander, Ferenczi, and Wilhelm Reich. Alexander found that the patients who tended to benefit the most greatly from therapy were those who could rapidly engage, could describe a specific therapeutic focus, and could quickly move to an experience of their previously warded-off feelings. These also happened to represent those patients who were the healthiest to begin with and therefore had the least need for the therapy being offered. Clinical research revealed that these patients were able to benefit because they were the least resistant. They were the least resistant because they were the least traumatised and therefore had the smallest burden of repressed emotion. However, among the patients coming to the clinic for various problems, the rapid responders represented only a small minority. What could be offered to those who represented the vast bulk of patients coming for treatment? See further Intensive short-term dynamic psychotherapy.

== The corrective emotional experience ==
In the forties ... Franz Alexander, following the lead of Sandor Ferenczi, proposed ... the form of a "corrective emotional experience", which enjoyed an enormous vogue.

Alexander stated:

The patient, in order to be helped, must undergo a corrective emotional experience suitable to repair the traumatic influence of previous experiences. It is of secondary importance whether this corrective experience takes place during treatment in the transference relationship, or parallel with the treatment in the daily life of the patient.

The concept provoked much controversy, provoking opposition from figures as disparate as Kurt R. Eissler, Edward Glover, and Jacques Lacan, who later said 'I did not hesitate to attack it myself in the most categorical way ... at the 1950 Congress of Psychiatry, but, it is the construction of a man of great talent'.

By the sixties, Alexander's conception was in retreat, and at the close of the following decade an analyst could ask rhetorically 'Who talks about Franz Alexander today — except those who want to put down his "corrective emotional experience" or to deny, as the Kohutians are at constant pains to do, that they are offering more of the same?'. Ongoing developments in object relations theory and the rise of self psychology would, however, lead to a revival of interest in the idea.

It was championed again by Moberly (1985). In the latter's view, corrective emotional experience represents essentially what is therapeutic in analysis'. Even those with continuing reservations about the idea conceded that 'when Alexander was writing ... it was pertinent for him to be drawing attention to the therapeutic value of the emotional experience of patients in analysis'.

In the twenty-first century, the term has passed into common psychodynamic parlance. Thus, notions of testing the relationship in cognitive therapy are seen as 'not dissimilar to the notion of the "corrective emotional experience" in psychodynamic therapy'; elucidation in existential therapy as opening up 'new experiences with the therapist, thus providing a corrective interpersonal experience'.

== Publications ==
- 1931, The Criminal, the judge and the public: A psychological analysis. (Together with Hugo Staub. Orig. ed. transl. by Gregory Zilboorg).
- 1960, The Western mind in transition: an eyewitness story. New York: Random House.
- 1961, The Scope of psychoanalysis 1921–1961: selected papers. 2nd. pr. New York: Basic Books.
- 1966, Psychoanalytic Pioneers. New York; London: Basic Books.
- 1968, The history of psychiatry. An evaluation of psychiatric thought and practice from prehistoric times to the present (co-author Sheldon T. Selesnick). New York [etc.]: New American Libr.
- 1969 [c1935] (with William Healy) Roots of crime: psychoanalytic studies, Montclair NJ: Patterson Smith.
- 1980, Psychoanalytic therapy. Principles and application. Franz Alexander and Thomas Morton French.
- 1984, The medical value of psychoanalysis. New York: Internat. Universities Pr., 1984. ISBN 0-8236-3285-7.
- 1950, Psychosomatic Medicine: Its Principles and Applications. 2nd. ed., New York; London: Norton. ISBN 0-393-70036-4.

== See also ==
- Bertram D. Lewin
- Gregory Zilboorg
- The Martians (scientists)
