= Frankwood Williams =

American psychiatrist (1883-1936)

Frankwood E. Williams
- Born: 18 May 1883
- Died: 24 September 1936 (aged 53)
- Occupation: psychiatrist

Frankwood E. Williams (18 May 1883 – 24 September 1936) was an American psychiatrist concerned with the science of human nature. He worked with the National Committee for Mental Hygiene to elevate the science of psychiatry with the goal of lowering the number of mental illness cases through prevention. He also shared the committee's second major goal of helping those patients who were already institutionalized. His life's work included a study of New York county prisons that indicated high rates of mental illness in the inmate populations, as well as showing that the childhood period was a critical time of life for mental health formation. He was influenced by the 1929 stock market crash, and the Soviet Union's structure and politics. Williams was the author of several books: Russia, Youth and the Present Day World (Farrar and Rinehart, Inc. 1934) Social Aspects of Mental Hygiene (Yale University Press, 1925) and the booklet, Reading with a Purpose No.16 Mental Hygiene (Chicago American Library Association, 1929).
