= Bertram D. Lewin =

American psychoanalyst (1896–1971)

Bertram David Lewin (30 November 1896 – 8 January 1971) was an American psychoanalyst who was both an acute clinician and a contributor to theory, particularly to the study of elation, and of the dream screen.

== Training and contributions ==
Lewin had a training analysis with Franz Alexander in Berlin in the 1920s, before publishing his first analytic article in 1930. This was followed by ten more over the next decade, on subjects ranging from diabetes and claustrophobia to the body as phallus. The main focus of his interest, however, was in manic states, which he saw as characterised by fleeting identifications with a multiple of outside figures.

After the war, he published the fruits of his investigations in The Psychoanalysis of Elation (1951). There he stressed the role of denial in mania – denial particularly of feelings of separation and loss. He also explored the paradox in elation's dark counterpart, depression, whereby the melancholic in seeking to punish the effigy of their loved one in fact punishes themselves having incorporated this effigy.

By that point he had also published his seminal article (1946) on the dream screen – the backcloth formed from primitive memories of the breast onto which the dream is projected. The concept would be fruitfully followed up both within analysis, and in the context of film theory.

== Selected publications ==
____The Image and the Past (1968)
