= Rudolf Löwenstein =

German author

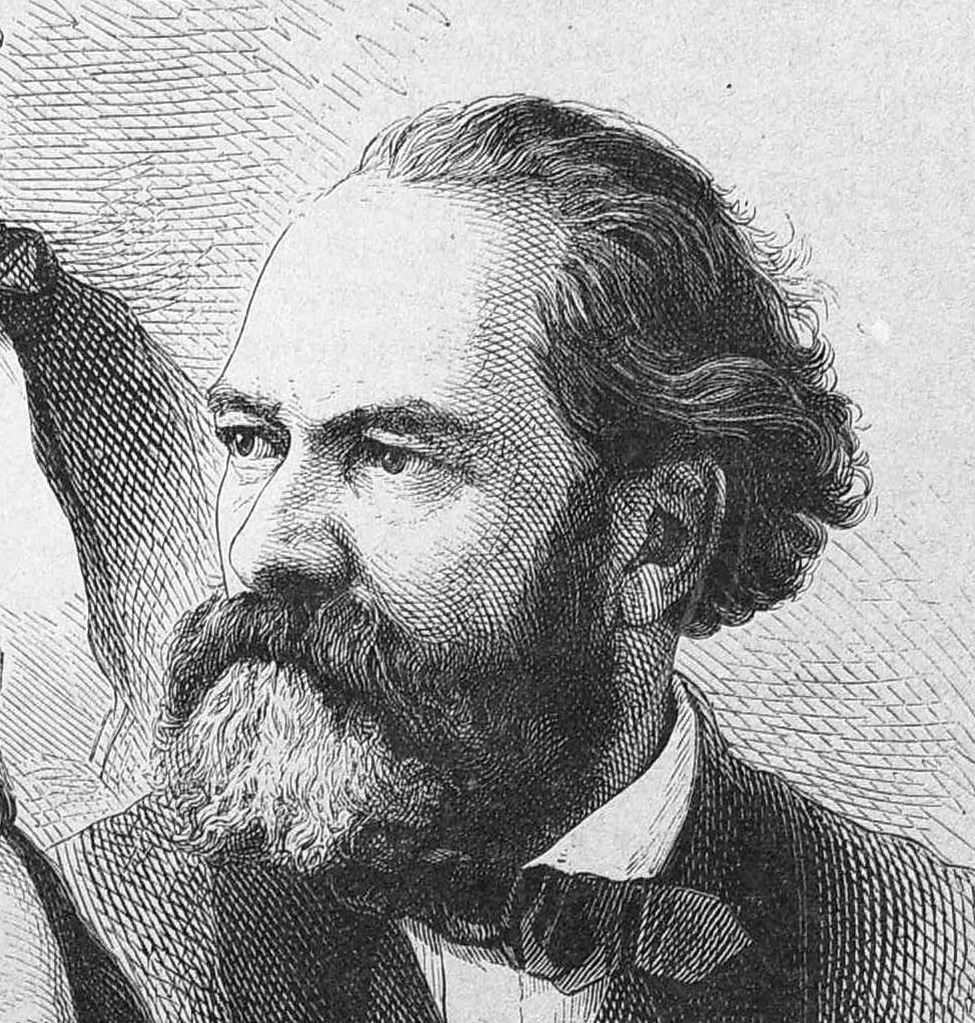

Rudolf Löwenstein (February 20, 1819, Breslau – January 6, 1891, Berlin) was a German author.

When only 9 years of age he was baptized. Educated at the gymnasium at Glogau and the universities of Breslau and Berlin, he received the degree of Ph.D. in 1843.

As early as 1836 some of Löwenstein's poems had been printed in the journals of Silesia; and his reputation was established by the appearance in 1846 of his Der Kindergarten, a collection of songs for children. In 1848 he with David Kalisch and Ernest Dohm founded the well-known Kladderadatsch, of which he became one of the chief editors.

The revolution of 1848 found Löwenstein on the liberal side, and he was expelled from Prussia in 1849 for his political activity. Returning to Berlin in 1850, he resumed the editorship of Kladderadatsch and continued in this capacity for 37 years. In 1863 he became editor also of the political part of the Gerichtszeitung. In 1887 he retired from public life.

Besides his Der Kindergarten, he wrote Ehret die Frauen, Berlin, 1874, and many songs, most of which were set to music.

His political poems in the Kladderadatsch gained him a wide reputation, especially those written during the eventful period 1860-80.

His grave is preserved in the Protestant Friedhof III der Jerusalems- und Neuen Kirchengemeinde (Cemetery No. III of the congregations of Jerusalem's Church and New Church) in Berlin-Kreuzberg, south of Hallesches Tor.
