= Charles Brenner (psychiatrist) =

American psychoanalyst (1913–2008)

- Born: November 18, 1913; Boston, Massachusetts, U.S.
- Died: May 19, 2008 (aged 94); New York City, U.S.
- Education: Harvard University (BA, MD)
- Known for: Modern conflict theory; revisions of structural theory; An Elementary Textbook of Psychoanalysis
- Spouse: Erma Brenner
- Children: 3
- Scientific career
- Fields: Psychoanalysis

Charles Brenner (November 18, 1913 – May 19, 2008) was an American psychoanalyst, educator, and author. He was regarded as one of the last major system-builders of American psychoanalysis, first codifying Freud’s structural model, and later dismantling it to develop what is now known as modern conflict theory.

A central figure at the New York Psychoanalytic Society and Institute for more than six decades, Brenner is best known for reshaping Freud’s ideas into a streamlined model of psychic conflict. His Elementary Textbook of Psychoanalysis (1955) introduced generations of students and clinicians to psychoanalytic thought.

Janet Malcolm described him as “the intransigent purist of American psychoanalysis,” yet his career was marked by repeated re-examination of psychoanalytic concepts and by a reputation as an excellent debater.

== Early life and education ==
Brenner was born in Boston to a lawyer father and schoolteacher mother in a household that prized scholarship and debate. He attended the Boston Latin School, entered Harvard College before age 14, and Harvard Medical School before age 18.

He trained in neurology at Boston City Hospital under Derek Denny-Brown and Houston Merritt, psychiatry at Boston Psychopathic Hospital, and psychoanalysis as a Sigmund Freud Fellow at the Boston Psychoanalytic Institute. His analytic training began in 1939 but was interrupted by World War II.

== Career ==
Brenner completed psychoanalytic training in New York in 1946 and became a training and supervising analyst in 1957. He served in leadership roles at the New York Psychoanalytic Society and Institute, the American Psychoanalytic Association, and the International Psychoanalytical Association. He was also a long-time editor and contributor to The Psychoanalytic Quarterly.

The New York Psychoanalytic Society later created the annual Brenner Award in his honor.

== Major works and contributions ==
=== An Elementary Textbook of Psychoanalysis (1955) ===
Originally lectures to psychiatry residents at Yale, the text became one of the most widely read introductions to psychoanalysis. Eric Berne praised it alongside Freud’s Outline of Psychoanalysis as essential reading.

=== Psychoanalytic Concepts and the Structural Theory (1964) ===
Co-authored with Jacob Arlow, the book defended the primacy of structural theory (id, ego, superego) over the earlier topographic model. Initially controversial, it became standard institute reading.

=== Later revisions ===
From the 1970s onward, Brenner challenged assumptions about affect theory, anxiety, and depressive affect. In The Mind in Conflict (1982) and Psychoanalysis or Mind and Meaning (2006), he abandoned structural theory altogether, arguing that all mental phenomena are compromise formations—negotiations between pleasure-seeking wishes and the avoidance of unpleasure.

Brenner also clashed with classical Freudian theory by rejecting the dictum that dreams are the “royal road to the unconscious,” maintaining instead that dreams were simply one form of compromise formation among many.

This framework, known as modern conflict theory, became a dominant orientation in American psychoanalytic training in the late 20th and early 21st centuries.

== Clinical approach ==
Brenner insisted that psychoanalysis was a branch of the natural sciences, grounded in observation and theory testing. He rejected analytic “pluralism” as unscientific and downplayed the privileged status of classic psychoanalytic constructs like “defense mechanisms” or “the self.”

He also opposed separating transference from the so-called working alliance, stressing that both were compromise formations. His teaching emphasized precision and theoretical clarity.

Brenner was also known for his provocations in everyday professional life. His psychoanalytic couch, along with all furniture and rugs in his consulting room, were completely white and kept in pristine condition. When asked for the reason for this choice, he would reply: “Oh, no theoretical reason, I just like the white color.”

== Reception and criticism ==
Brenner was widely respected for the clarity of his thought, but his uncompromising theoretical stance drew criticism. Colleagues noted his tendency to adopt a solitary, self-directed approach, habitually at the expense of dialogue with alternative schools of thought.

Supporters saw his work as a rigorous, science-based reformulation of Freud; critics viewed it as overly reductive, neglecting object relations, relational, and developmental perspectives.

Despite controversies, his formulations remain influential in analytic curricula and continue to define the “conflict theory” tradition in American psychoanalysis.

== Personal life ==
Brenner married Erma Brenner, with whom he shared a deep love of chamber music, literature, and the arts. Friends and colleagues recalled evenings of four-hand piano, canoeing in Maine, and his generosity in mentoring younger analysts.

Even in his nineties, he kept up with technological changes. He manually converted his extensive CD collection into digital audio files, carefully researching methods to preserve the highest possible sound quality.

Brenner died in New York City on May 19, 2008, at age 94, from complications of diverticulitis.

== Legacy and influence ==
Brenner’s influence endures in both training curricula and analytic debates. An Elementary Textbook remains a standard introduction, while his later writings reshaped theory courses in many American institutes. The Brenner Award at the New York Psychoanalytic Society honors contributions to theory and technique that continue his legacy of rigor and clarity.

For many clinicians trained after the 1980s, Brenner’s modern conflict theory offered a pragmatic, scientifically framed alternative to more pluralistic or relational models. His insistence that psychoanalysis be treated as a natural science continues to shape discussions on the discipline’s identity and future.

== Quotations ==
- “If an analyst is pretty much on the right track with a patient, even an imperfect interpretation is likely to be useful.”
- “Analysis cannot do what is impossible, i.e., to eradicate or eliminate psychic conflict. But it can make the difference between crippling inhibition and successful functioning, between misery and happiness, or between life and death.”
- “Every aspect of mental functioning that we are able to observe is a compromise formation—an attempt to achieve pleasure while avoiding unpleasure.”

== Selected bibliography ==
- An Elementary Textbook of Psychoanalysis (1955)
- Psychoanalytic Concepts and the Structural Theory (with Jacob Arlow, 1964)
- Psychoanalytic Technique and Psychic Conflict (1976)
- The Mind in Conflict (1982)
- Psychoanalysis or Mind and Meaning (2006)

== See also ==
- Ego psychology
- Jacob Arlow
