= Spiegel (surname) =

Spiegel is a surname of German origin. In German language Spiegel means mirror.

Spiegel is an ancient German Christian surname. Family tradition says it was taken from a town or lake named Spiegel. There is a small community south of Munich named Spiegel. The name Spiegel goes back to at least the 12th century, when the Spiegel family were barons of Desenburg and Peckelsheim in Hessen; one noted person was Heinrich III Spiegel zum Desenberg (1361–80), Bishop of Paderborn.

There are also a significant number of Jewish people with the surname, and it is said that this name originated from a house sign in the Frankfurt am Main (Judengasse) picturing a mirror. The form Spiegel is documented in Frankfurt am Main since the 16th century. Variants are Szpiegel, Schpiegel, Shpi(e)gel, Şpighel, etc.

== People with the surname Spiegel ==
- Adam Spiegel aka Spike Jonze (born 1969), American film director
- Anne Spiegel (born 1980), German politicians (The Greens)
- Arthur Spiegel, Chicago mail-order businessman and early American film studio executive
- Chaike Belchatowska Spiegel (1920–2002), Jewish resistance fighter in the Warsaw Ghetto Uprising
- David Spiegel (born 1945), son of Herbert Spiegel, American psychiatrist and medical hypnotist
- Edward A. Spiegel (1931–2020), American astrophysicist
- Evan Spiegel (born 1990), American entrepreneur, inventor of Snapchat
- Friedrich (von) Spiegel (1820–1905), an orientalist at the University of Erlangen
- Giora Spiegel (born 1947), a Jewish-Israeli footballer and manager
- Herbert Spiegel (1914–2009), American psychiatrist and medical hypnotist, who treated the woman known as Sybil
- Isaiah Spiegel (1906–1990), Polish and Israeli poet, writer and essayist writing in Yiddish, Holocaust survivor
- Jacob Spiegel (1902–1984), Justice of the Massachusetts Supreme Judicial Court
- Joseph Spiegel (1840–1918), founder of Spiegel Catalog
- Laurie Spiegel (born 1945), an American composer
- Marcus M. Spiegel (1829–1864), Colonel in the Union Army during the American Civil War
- Murray R. Spiegel (1923–1991), American mathematician
- Paul Spiegel (1937–2006), leader of the Central Council of Jews in Germany
- Sam Spiegel (1901–1985), Polish-born film producer
- Sam Spiegel (musician), American producer/DJ and brother of Spike Jonze
- Samuel A. Spiegel (1914–1977), American lawyer, politician, and judge
- Sarah Spiegel, American singer
- Scott Spiegel (1957–2025), American screenwriter, film director, producer and actor
- Simon Spiegel (born 1977), Swiss German privatdozent for film studies and critic
- Tilly Spiegel (1906–1988), European wartime resistance activist and postwar researcher into victims of Nazism

=== Fictional ===
- Spike Spiegel, Bounty hunter, pilot and former gangster; a character in Cowboy Bebop

== See also ==
- Spiegl
- Spiegle
- Spiegler
- Spiegelmann
- Spigel
