= Dodge Center High School =

School in Minnesota, United States

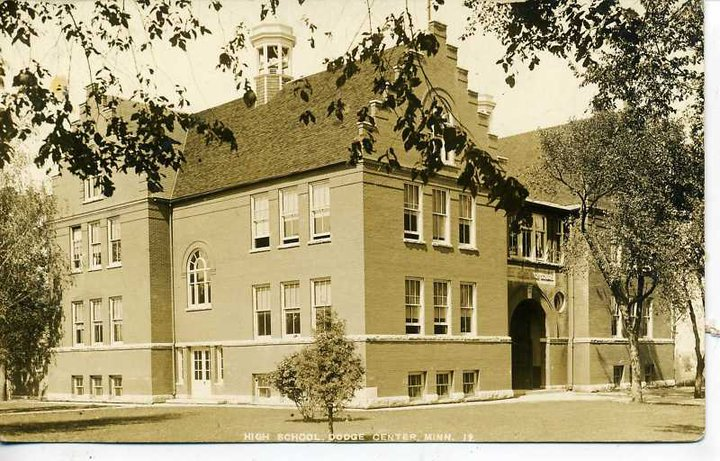

Location
- Dodge Center, Minnesota; United States
- Coordinates: 44°1′45″N 92°51′33″W

Information
- Type: High school, grades 7 - 12
- Colors: Green and white
- Mascot: Dodger
- Yearbook: Centerite

Dodge Center High School was a high school located in Dodge Center, Minnesota, United States. It existed from the 1870s until 1990.

== History ==
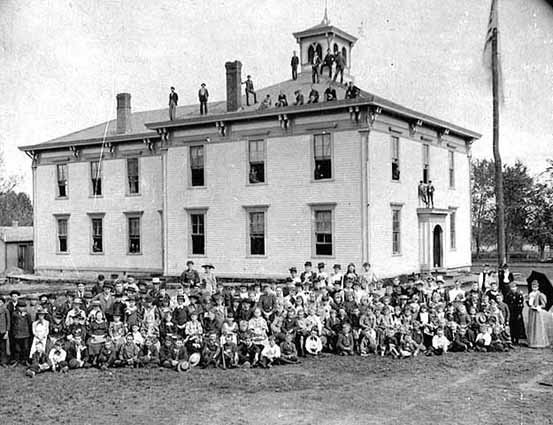
Dodge Center School - 1886

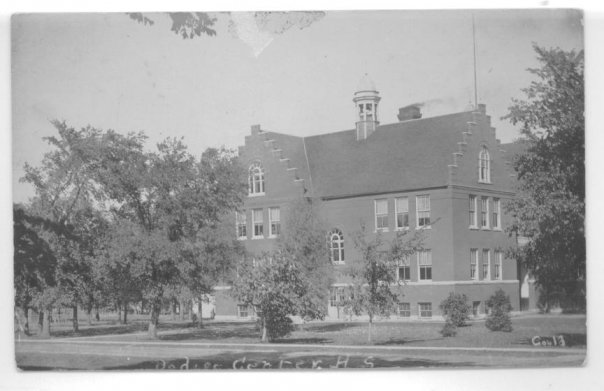
Dodge Center High School, circa 1900

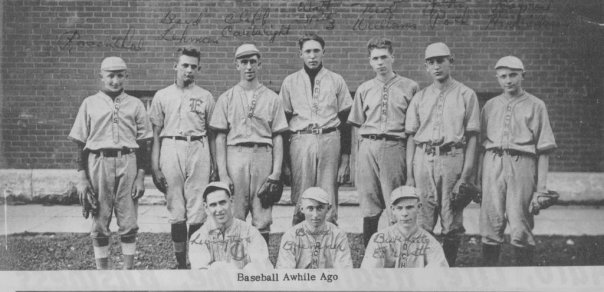
Dodge Center High School baseball team, early 1900s

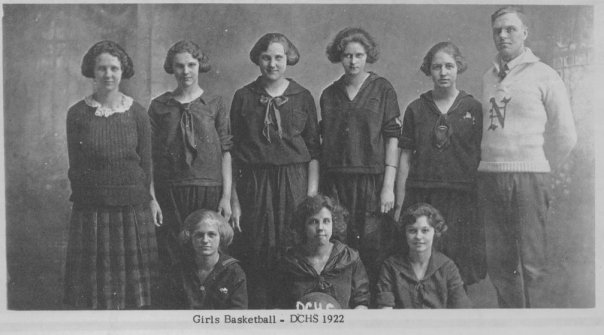
Dodge Center High School girls' basketball team, 1922

The Dodge Center area was first settled in the 1850s and officially became a town in 1869. By 1870, the one-room schoolhouse, in which a Mrs. Rice taught, had become too small. The people of Dodge Center built a wooden, L-shaped, two-story schoolhouse, costing about $15,000. The first high school commencement exercises were held in 1885. When that school was also outgrown, a red brick high school was built in 1898.

The 1898 building, at the corner of 1st Ave NW and 3rd Street NW, housed the high school until 1972. A gymnasium, auditorium and two classrooms were added in 1936, part of President Franklin Roosevelt's WPA program. An addition of a library and home-economics room was added in 1950 and an elementary school building was constructed in 1958 and was utilized by Triton until circa 1998. All have since been demolished, making way for an apartment complex called "Dodger 56."

It is not known when the school chose a nickname or when it started participating in organized athletics. Dodge Center school colors were maroon and gold until the 1930s (or early 1940s), when they were changed to green and white. The nickname was Dodgers. The school fight song was "D.C. Rouser," to the tune of the "Minnesota Rouser," from the University of Minnesota.

In 1952, the Dodge Center High School football team became one of six Minnesota high school teams to not allow a single point in a season.

An official school annual was first published in 1948 and called Dodger Digest. In the early 1950s, the annual was called DO-CE-HI, then changed to Centerite, which continued publishing each year through 1990 (the last class to graduate from Dodge Center High School).

== Consolidation ==
In 1990, Dodge Center's school district merged with the neighboring towns of West Concord and Claremont to form Triton High School. Triton's mascot is the Cobra and colors are maroon and gray. Dodge Center is now home to Triton Primary, Triton Middle School and Triton Senior High School. The first commencement exercises were held in 1991.

The Triton athletic fields are named for former Dodge Center High School football coach, Wally Hitt.

== Notable alumni ==
- Perry Greeley Holden, agronomist
- Shirley Ardell Mason (Class of 1941), well-known psychiatric patient and subject of the 1973 book Sybil by Flora Rheta Schreiber and the 2011 book Sybil Exposed by Debbie Nathan
