= Herbert Spiegel =

American psychiatrist (1914–2009)

- Born: June 29, 1914; McKeesport, Pennsylvania
- Died: December 15, 2009 (aged 95); Manhattan
- Occupation: psychiatrist

Herbert Spiegel (June 29, 1914 – December 15, 2009) was an American psychiatrist who popularized therapeutic hypnosis as a mainstream medical treatment for patients experiencing pain, anxiety, and addictions. He also is known for his treatment of the woman known as Sybil, whose case became the subject of a book, 1976 television miniseries and 2007 television movie.

Herbert Spiegel was the father of David Spiegel, M.D., of Stanford University, who is also an expert in hypnosis.

== Biography ==
=== Early years ===
Born in McKeesport, Pennsylvania, Spiegel attended the University of Pittsburgh and the University of Maryland Medical School. He first learned hypnosis while he was a resident at St. Elizabeths Hospital in Washington, D.C.

During World War II, Spiegel used hypnosis as a treatment for pain control while serving as a battalion surgeon with the First Infantry in North Africa. With the use of hypnosis, Spiegel was able to reduce the use of morphine in treating soldiers wounded in battle. He later wrote, "I discovered that it was possible to use persuasion and suggestion to help the men return to previous levels of function" after sustaining severe combat stress.

=== Advocate ===
For many years, Spiegel was a clinical professor of psychiatry at the College of Physicians and Surgeons at Columbia University, where he continued his research and study on hypnosis and taught postgraduate courses on the subject. He was a pioneer in the use of hypnosis as a tool to help patients control pain, stop smoking, eat less, shed phobias and ease anxieties. Spiegel noted that, until the late 1930s, hypnosis had largely been the domain of "quacks," but gave credit to them for keeping the practice alive: "We are in debt to the quacks for keeping it alive until the medical community started to investigate and find out what a useful tool hypnotism is."

In 1965, Spiegel's research on hypnosis using closed-circuit television as a means of mass education or group treatment raised concerns that "unscrupulous operators might confuse and exploit viewers at home" through use of hypnosis by television.

In 1969, Spiegel reported to the American Medical Association's 118th annual meeting on his clinical technique for teaching patients to use "self-hypnosis" that helped one out of five "hard-core" cigarette smokers to give up the habit, and offered some help to many others. Spiegel reported on the theory underlying his "positive" approach to self-hypnosis with an emphasis on respecting and protecting the patient's body:

"To concentrate on not having an itch on your nose is to increase the likelihood of an itch. Likewise, to concentrate on not smoking is to increase your preoccupation with smoking. But, committing yourselves to respect and protect your body distracts attention away from the urge to smoke. It is a way to ignore the urge. When this urge is repeatedly not satisfied by ignoring it, it eventually withers away."

Spiegel was also a co-director of the Hypnosis Research and Training Foundation in Orlando, Florida, conducting seminars on therapeutic hypnosis for healthcare practitioners. Spiegel and his son, David Siegel, co-authored the medical textbook, "Trance and Treatment." Spiegel told a reporter in 1977 that he had used hypnosis to help 4,000 patients control obesity, phobias or addiction to cigarettes over the past ten years.

Spiegel's work in the field of hypnosis has been credited with establishing the practice as a legitimate medical therapy. In 1976, the New York News wrote that Spiegel was "one of the people whose work over the past few decades has helped strip away the aura of charlatanism and make hypnosis a respectable medical tool."

In 1981, the UPI ran a feature story on Spiegel's advocacy of hypnosis in which Spiegel was quoted as saying:

"The prevalent and wrong attitude in the practice of medicine is use a pill or scalpel or a gadget for problem-solving. Modern medicine puts such extreme emphasis on high technology and drugs that it often overlooks the oldest, and at times the most effective, therapeutic instrument that humans possess—the mind. Medicine resorts to it last instead of first. Hypnosis—which accomplishes alterations in human awareness—is a great way to very directly and quickly get people to alter pain."

Spiegel became the most noted advocate of therapeutic hypnosis in the United States and developed a status as a celebrity. In its obituary of Spiegel, The New York Times wrote: "Broadway actors sought his help to overcome stage fright, singers to quit smoking, politicians to overcome fear of flying. For years he had a regular table at Elaine's, as well as his own place on the national stage. Dr. Herbert Spiegel's regular table [at Elaine's] was near Woody Allen's at what was a fixture of the New York intellectual and creative scene in the 1960s and '70s."

=== "Sybil" ===
Spiegel also gained notoriety for his role in the treatment of Shirley Ardell Mason, whose case became the subject of the book, "Sybil," the 1976 television miniseries "Sybil starring Sally Field, and the 2007 television movie "Sybil" starring Jessica Lange. In the 1960s, Spiegel saw Mason for approximately four years after Mason's regular therapist, Dr. Cornelia B. Wilbur, sought Spiegel's assistance in sharpening the diagnosis. According to Spiegel, Wilbur had diagnosed Sybil at the time as a schizophrenic.

Spiegel examined Sybil and discovered that she was highly hypnotizable. Spiegel used Sybil for a number of studies and as a demonstration case in his classes on hypnosis at Columbia. He developed a rapport with Sybil and became a surrogate therapist when Wilbur was unavailable. During one of his regression studies, Sybil asked Spiegel, "Well, do you want me to be Helen?" According to Spiegel, Sybil told her that "Helen" was "a name Dr. Wilbur gave me for this feeling." Spiegel believed that Wilbur "was helping her identify aspects of her life, or perspectives, that she then called by name. By naming them this way, she was reifying a memory of some kind and converting it into a 'personality.'" Spiegel saw Sybil's "personalities" as game-playing.

Spiegel recalled that Wilbur later came to him with author Flora Rheta Schreiber and asked him to co-author the book with them. In the course of the discussion, they told him that they would be calling Sybil a "multiple personality." Spiegel recalls telling them, "But she's not a multiple personality!" When Spiegel told Wilbur and Schreiber that it would not be accurate to call Sybil a multiple personality, and that it was not at all consistent with what he knew about her, Spiegel recalled that "Schreiber then got in a huff" and said, "But if we don't call it a multiple personality, we don't have a book! The publishers want it to be that, otherwise it won't sell!" Spiegel declined to have any involvement in the book and later made public his view that the popularization of the "Sybil" multiple-personality story was "an embarrassing phase of American psychiatry."

Wilbur's diagnosis of multiple personality disorder was later challenged by critics who suggested that Wilbur "had encouraged the woman's behavior."

=== Writer ===
Spiegel was the author of several published works. These include:

- "Trance and Treatment: Clinical Uses of Hypnosis," co-authored with his son, David Spiegel, M.D.
- "War stress and neurotic illness," co-authored with Abram Kardiner

=== Death ===
Spiegel died in December 2009 at age 95. He died in his sleep in his Manhattan apartment.
