= Spigel =

Spigel is a surname, a variant of Spiegel. Notable people with the surname include:

- Lynn Spigel (fl. 2004), American author
- Malka Spigel (born 1954), Israeli musician and artist
- Natan Spigel (1892–1942), Jewish painter born in Poland

== See also ==
- Spiegl
- Spiegle
- Spiegler
- Spiegelmann
