= Sybil (1976 film) =

1976 film directed by Daniel Petrie

- Release poster
- Genre: Mystery drama
- Based on: Sybil by Flora Rheta Schreiber
- Screenplay by: Stewart Stern
- Directed by: Daniel Petrie
- Starring: Sally Field; Joanne Woodward
- Theme music composer: Leonard Rosenman
- Country of origin: United States
- Original language: English

Production
- Executive producers: Philip Capice; Peter Dunne
- Producer: Jacqueline Babbin
- Production locations: New York City; Stage 17, Warner Brothers Burbank Studios - 4000 Warner Boulevard, Burbank, California
- Cinematography: Mario Tosi
- Editors: Michael S. McLean; Rita Roland
- Running time: 198 minutes (original television); 133 minutes (theatrical); 187 minutes (DVD)
- Production company: Lorimar Productions

Original release
- Network: NBC
- Release: November 14 – November 15, 1976

Sybil is a 1976 two-part American made-for-television film starring Sally Field and Joanne Woodward. It is based on the book of the same name, and was broadcast on NBC on November 14–15, 1976.

== Plot ==
After suffering a small breakdown in front of her students (and then being forced to hear a neighbor play Chopin's Étude in A Minor, "Winter Wind", incessantly), Sybil Dorsett is given a neurological examination by Dr. Cornelia Wilbur, a psychiatrist. She admits to having blackouts and fears that they are getting worse. Dr. Wilbur theorizes that the incidents are a kind of hysteria, all related to a deeper problem. She asks Sybil to return at a later date for more therapy. Sybil says she will have to ask her father.

Sybil's father, Willard Dorsett, and her stepmother, Freida, are in New York on a visit. Sybil meets them at a cafeteria for lunch. She explains to her father that the problems she used to have as a young girl have returned and that she wants to see a psychiatrist, Dr. Wilbur. Sybil's father makes it clear to Sybil that they disapprove of psychiatry. Sybil becomes upset and dissociates into Peggy, who becomes enraged and breaks a glass. Peggy angrily storms out of the cafeteria. Later that evening, Dr. Wilbur receives a late night call from someone who identifies herself as Vickie and says Sybil is about to jump out a hotel window. Dr. Wilbur rescues Sybil, who denies knowing Vickie. Suddenly, Sybil becomes hysterical and begins speaking like a young girl. This girl introduces herself as Peggy, and Wilbur realizes that Sybil is suffering from multiple personality disorder (now known as dissociative identity disorder).

Vickie introduces herself to Wilbur at the next session. Vickie, who knows everything about the other personalities, tells Wilbur about some of them, including Marcia, who is suicidal, and Vanessa, who plays the piano although Sybil has not played in years and swears she has forgotten how to play piano.

Over the weeks, each of the personalities introduces herself to Wilbur. At the same time, the personality Vanessa falls in love with a charming neighbor named Richard.

Wilbur finally explains to Sybil about the other personalities. As proof, Wilbur plays the session's tape to allow Sybil to hear their voices, but when a voice that sounds like Sybil's mother Hattie speaks, an infant personality named Ruthie emerges. Wilbur is unable to communicate with the pre-verbal child and must wait until Sybil returns.

Life becomes more chaotic for Sybil as the other personalities grow stronger. The personalities make Dr. Wilbur a Christmas card, but Sybil made everything purple, a color that frightens Peggy. Dr. Wilbur hypnotizes Vickie and asks about the purple. Vickie relates a memory of a time Sybil's mother locked young Sybil in the wheat bin in the barn. Thinking she was smothering, Sybil used her purple crayon to scratch on the inside of the bin so someone would know she had been there.

Vanessa invites Richard and his son Matthew to have Christmas dinner, after which Richard spends the night in Sybil's apartment. Sybil has a nightmare and awakens as Marcia, who tries to throw herself off the roof. Richard rescues her and calls Wilbur. Soon afterwards, Richard moves away, crushing both Sybil and Vanessa. Once again confronted with her diagnosis, Sybil attempts to convince Wilbur that she has in fact been faking all of the other personalities the entire time and denies that multiple personalities exist within her.

Wilbur goes in search of Sybil's father, who mentions that Sybil's mother Hattie was diagnosed with paranoid schizophrenia but denies that she ever abused Sybil. Wilbur also seeks out Sybil's pediatrician. The doctor gives Wilbur a frightening account of extensive internal scarring he found while treating Sybil for a bladder problem. Finally, Wilbur visits the old Dorsett house, where she discovers the green kitchen Sybil's selves have described many times. She also finds the purple crayon scratches inside the wheat bin. She takes them back to New York City to prove all the memories really happened.

Dr. Wilbur takes Sybil for a drive, during which Peggy reveals the horrific physical abuse she suffered at her mother's hands. After Peggy exhausts herself, Sybil emerges, remembering everything that Peggy has just said. Finally, she is able to express her rage against her mother.

Dr. Wilbur hypnotizes Sybil to introduce her to the other personalities. Sybil, who has always been frightened of Peggy, meets her at last and is surprised that she is only a young girl. Sybil embraces a weeping Peggy. A voiceover from Dr. Wilbur explains that after this incident, Sybil recovered her memories and went on to live a full and happy life as an academic.

== Cast ==
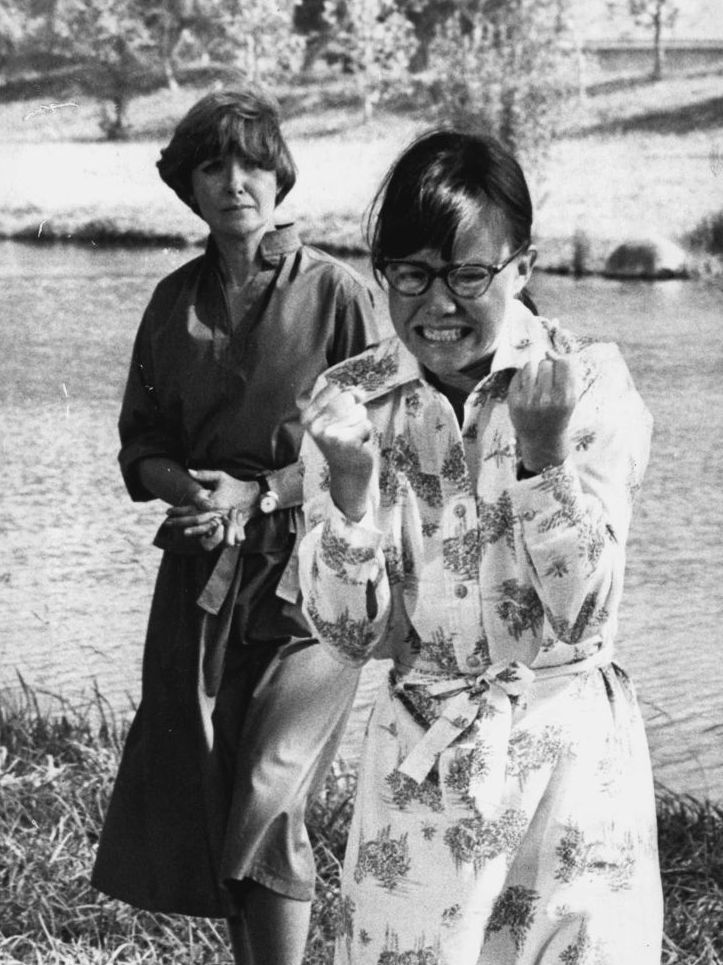
Joanne Woodward and Sally Field

- Joanne Woodward as Dr. Cornelia Wilbur
- Sally Field as Sybil Dorsett
- Brad Davis as Richard, Sybil's neighbor boyfriend
- Martine Bartlett as Hattie Dorsett, Sybil's mother
- Penelope Allen as Miss Penny
- Jane Hoffman as Frieda Dorsett
- Charles Lane as Dr. Quinoness
- Jessamine Milner as Grandma Dorsett
- William Prince as Willard Dorsett
- Camila Ashland as Cam
- Tommy Crebbs as Matthew
- Gina Petrushka as Dr. Lazarus
- Harold Pruett as Danny
- Natasha Ryan as Child Sybil
- Paul Tulley as Dr. Castle
- Anne Beesley as The Selves
- Virginia Campbell as The Selves
- Missy Karn as The Selves
- Tasha Lee as The Selves
- Cathy Lynn Lesko as The Selves
- Rachel Longaker as The Selves
- Jennifer McAllister as The Selves
- Kerry Muir as The Selves
- Karen Obediear as The Selves
- Tony Sherman as The Selves
- Danny Stevenson as The Selves
- Gordon Jump as Tractor farmer
- Lionel Pina as Tommy

== Alters ==
- Peggy: A nine-year-old girl who believes she is still in the small town in which Sybil grew up. Peggy holds the rage Sybil felt at her mother's abuse and frequently expresses her anger through temper tantrums and breaking glass. Like many of the selves, she enjoys drawing and painting. She fears hands, dishtowels, music, and the colors green and purple, all triggers to specific instances of abuse.
- Vickie: A very sophisticated and mature eighteen-year-old girl who is aware of all the other personalities and knows everything the others do, though Sybil does not. Vickie speaks French and claims to have grown up in Paris with many brothers and sisters and loving parents. The dominant personality and the only personality to undergo hypnosis.
- Vanessa: A young, vibrant, red-haired girl about twelve years old, she is outgoing and full of "joie de vivre". Falls in love with Richard and helps Sybil build a relationship with him, until he moves away.
- Marcia: A young girl obsessed with thoughts of death and suicide, who tries to kill herself (and thus Sybil) on several occasions. Dresses in black.
- Ruthie: A preverbal infant. When Sybil is extremely frightened, she regresses into Ruthie and cannot move or speak.
- Mary: Named for and strongly resembles Sybil's grandmother. When Sybil's grandmother (the only person Sybil felt loved her) died, Sybil was so bereft that she created Mary as an internalized version of Grandma. Mary speaks in the voice of an old woman and frequently behaves as one.
- Nancy: A product of Sybil's father's religious fanaticism, Nancy fears the end of the world and God's punishment.
- Clara: Around 8–9 years old. Very religious; critical and resentful of Sybil.
- Helen: Around 13–14 years old. Timid and afraid, but determined "to be somebody".
- Marjorie: Around 10–11 years old. Serene and quick to laugh, enjoys parties and travel.
- Sybil Ann: Around 5–6 years old. Pale, timid, and extremely lethargic; the defeated Sybil.
- Mike: A brash young boy who likes to build and do carpentry. He builds bookshelves and a partition wall for Sybil's apartment, frightening her badly when she does not know how they got there. He and Sid both believe that they will grow a penis and be able "to give a girl a baby" when they are older.
- Sid: Younger and a little more taciturn than Mike, he also enjoys building things, as well as sports. Identifies strongly with Sybil's father and wants to be like him when he grows up.

== Production ==
Sally Field stars in the title role, with Joanne Woodward playing the part of Sybil's psychiatrist, Cornelia B. Wilbur. Woodward herself had starred in The Three Faces of Eve, in which she portrayed a woman with three personalities, winning the Academy Award for Best Actress for the role. Based on the book Sybil by Flora Rheta Schreiber, the movie dramatizes the life of a shy young graduate student, Sybil Dorsett (in real life, Shirley Ardell Mason), suffering from dissociative identity disorder as a result of the psychological trauma she suffered as a child. With the help of her psychiatrist, Sybil gradually recalls the severe child abuse that led to the development of 16 different personalities. According to Sally Field, in her 2018 memoir In Pieces, Director Anthony Page was removed from the production due to insensitivity to Field’s portrayal and lack of belief in therapy. Field, Sally (2018). In Pieces. Grand Central Publishing Field's portrayal of Sybil won much critical acclaim, as well as an Emmy Award.

== Edited and unedited versions ==
The film, originally 198 minutes long, was initially shown over the course of two nights on NBC in 1976. Due to high public interest, the VHS version of Sybil was released in the 1980s, with one version running 122 minutes and another, extended version running 132 minutes. Several key scenes, including Sybil's final climactic "introduction" to her other personalities, are missing in both versions. The film is shown frequently on television, often with scenes restored or deleted to adjust for time constraints and the varying sensitivity of viewers. The DVD includes the full 198-minute version originally displayed on the NBC broadcast.

A 128-minute edit of the film was shown in cinemas in Australia, opening in January 1978.

== Awards and nominations ==
Award	Category	Nominee(s)	Result	Ref.
American Cinema Editors Awards	Best Edited Television Special	Rita Roland and Michael S. McLean	Nominated	
Golden Globe Awards	Best Motion Picture – Made for Television		Nominated	
Peabody Awards	NBC-TV for "a truly outstanding dramatic program"		Won	
Primetime Emmy Awards	Outstanding Special – Drama or Comedy	Peter Dunne, Philip Capice, and Jacqueline Babbin	Won (Note: Tied with Eleanor and Franklin: The White House Years.)	
Primetime Emmy Awards	Outstanding Lead Actress in a Special Program – Drama or Comedy	Sally Field	Won	
Primetime Emmy Awards	Outstanding Lead Actress in a Special Program – Drama or Comedy	Joanne Woodward	Nominated	
Primetime Emmy Awards	Outstanding Writing in a Special Program – Drama or Comedy – Adaptation	Stewart Stern	Won	
Primetime Emmy Awards	Outstanding Cinematography in Entertainment Programming for a Special	Mario Tosi	Nominated	
Primetime Emmy Awards	Outstanding Achievement in Music Composition for a Special (Dramatic Underscore)	Leonard Rosenman & Alan and Marilyn Bergman	Won	

== In popular culture ==
English pop/rock band Tears for Fears named their 1985 album Songs From the Big Chair after the 1976 TV movie, as the title character could only prevent herself from using her different guises as defense mechanisms when she was sitting in her analyst's "big chair". The band also recorded a song called "The Big Chair", which was not included on the original album but was released shortly prior as the B-side of their 1984 hit single "Shout". The song, though mostly instrumental, included dialogue sampled from the film including Field's character saying "She wants to sit beside you in the big chair." The song has since been included as a bonus track on various re-releases of the album."

== See also ==
- Shirley Ardell Mason, the real-life patient upon whom the book and film are based
