= Sybil (2007 film) =

2008 film directed by Joseph Sargent

- Based on: Sybil by Flora Rheta Schreiber
- Written by: John Pielmeier
- Directed by: Joseph Sargent
- Starring: Jessica Lange; Tammy Blanchard
- Music by: Charles Bernstein
- Country of origin: United States
- Original language: English

Production
- Executive producers: Norman Stephens; Mark Wolper
- Producer: Michael Mahoney
- Cinematography: Donald M. Morgan
- Editor: Mike Brown
- Running time: 89 minutes
- Production companies: Warner Bros. Television; Wolper Organization

Original release
- Network: CBS
- Release: June 7, 2008

Sybil is a 2007 American made-for-television drama film directed by Joseph Sargent, and written by John Pielmeier, based on the 1973 book Sybil by Flora Rheta Schreiber, which fictionalized the story of Shirley Ardell Mason, who was diagnosed with multiple personality disorder (more commonly known then as "split personality", now called dissociative identity disorder). This is the second adaptation of the book, following the Emmy Award-winning 1976 mini-series Sybil that was broadcast by NBC. The university scenes were filmed at Dalhousie University in Nova Scotia.

In January 2006, The Hollywood Reporter announced CBS had greenlit the project, but it was shelved after completion. The film was released in Italy, New Zealand, the Dominican Republic, Brazil, Norway and Hungary before finally being broadcast in the US by CBS on June 7, 2008.

== Plot ==
Troubled Columbia University art student and later student teacher Sybil Dorsett is referred to psychiatrist Cornelia Wilbur by Dr. Atcheson, a colleague who believes that the young woman is suffering from female hysteria. As her treatment progresses, Sybil confesses that she frequently experiences blackouts and cannot account for large blocks of time. Wilbur helps her recall a childhood in which she suffered physical, emotional, and sexual abuse at the hands of her disturbed mother Hattie.

Eventually, 16 identities varying in age and personal traits begin to emerge. Chief among them is Victoria, a French woman who explains to Dr. Wilbur how she shepherds the many parts of Sybil's whole. Frustrating the therapist are objections raised by her associates, who suspect she has influenced her patient into creating her other selves, and Sybil's father Willard, who refuses to admit his late wife Hattie was anything other than a loving mother.

Although she had promised never to hypnotize Sybil, later into the treatment, Dr. Wilbur takes her patient to her home by a lake and hypnotizes her into having all 16 personalities be the same age as she and become just aspects of Sybil. By nightfall, Sybil claims she feels different, and emotionally declares her hatred toward Hattie.

The last part of the movie tells of the history of Shirley Ardell Mason, the real woman who was known by the pseudonym of Sybil Dorsett.

== Principal cast ==
- Jessica Lange as Dr. Cornelia Wilbur
- Tammy Blanchard as Sybil Dorsett
  - Alison Murray as Young Sybil Dorsett
- JoBeth Williams as Hattie Dorsett
- Fab Filippo as Ramon
- Brian Downey as Willard Dorsett

== Critical reception ==
In his review in The New York Times, Neil Genzlinger noted: "The film has fine performances by Tammy Blanchard in the title role and Jessica Lange as the psychiatrist. It is crisply told and full of powerful scenes. But it is always battling that earlier Sybil ... [The] story, so revelatory and startling when it was new, is today likely to have the feel of an acting exercise. It is impossible to watch Ms. Blanchard run through her repertory of voices and facial contortions ... without judging her acting technique. She gets an A, but the viewer's investment in the story suffers."

Mary McNamara of the Los Angeles Times said: "The new Sybil ... is told at such high speed that it becomes more psychiatric variety show—for our next number, Sybil as a boy!—than the careful excavation of a mind through the life-changing relationship of patient and doctor, which made the original so unforgettable ... It's essentially a two-woman play, and these particular women do the absolute best they can with what is given them. Lange's Wilbur is unflinching and unflappable, with equal parts compassion and ambition, empathy and bitterness, while Blanchard is a marvel of physical and vocal elasticity, changing into 16 people, often several in the same conversation. The problem is the almost breakneck pace which requires that all emotional nuance be jettisoned in favor of showing the range of the personalities."

In Newsweek, Joshua Alston said the film "has the infectious scrappiness of a community-theater troupe, one that isn't that great, but has enough conviction to make up for its lack of self-awareness ... And while I wouldn't watch Sybil a second time, it was raucous, nostalgic fun. I could say it's the worst movie I've seen in some time, but I'd prefer to say it's the best at being not good."

Roger Catlin of the Hartford Courant observed the film "is at once a little more true to the original, but also, at half the time, rushed ... Tammy Blanchard has the role that could be either a career-making tour de force or a showoffy mess and pulls it off."

In the Times Herald-Record, Kevin McDonough said: "Sybil seems to have been written to challenge and reward the serious performer. It is an actor's dream and potential nightmare, a role that calls upon the player to shift voice, tone and personality on a dime ... Blanchard acquits herself well. She does not eclipse the memory of Field's Sybil, but it is a performance to remember ... The saddest thing about this Sybil is its place in the schedule. A film like this used to be showcased during sweeps, not hidden away on a Saturday night in June like some poor relation ... CBS has shown the movie, its stars, and the story extreme disrespect with this treatment."

Matthew Gilbert of the Boston Globe wondered, "Why bother taking on a classic with limited popular potential when the remake is doomed to pale creatively next to the original? I'm thinking maybe this retelling of the true story ... was hatched to give actress Tammy Blanchard a big vehicle to suit her big talent ... Otherwise, this Sybil doesn't quite justify itself ... The remake feels more like a sketch of a troubled life than a fully realized portrait, which also detracts from its power to break your heart."
