= Joseph Kallinger =

American serial killer

- Kallinger in 1975
- Born: Joseph Lee Brenner III; December 11, 1935; Philadelphia, Pennsylvania, U.S.
- Died: March 26, 1996 (aged 60); Cresson Township, Pennsylvania, U.S.
- Other name: The Shoemaker
- Spouses: Hilda Bergman (m. 1952; div. 1956) Elizabeth Baumgard (m. 1958)
- Children: 7
- Convictions: Arson, child abuse, murder, rape
- Penalty: Life imprisonment

Details
- Victims: 3
- Span of crimes: July 7, 1974 – January 8, 1975
- Country: United States
- States: Pennsylvania and New Jersey
- Date apprehended: January 17, 1975

Joseph Kallinger (born Joseph Lee Brenner III; December 11, 1935 – March 26, 1996) was an American serial killer who murdered three people and tortured four families. He committed the latter crimes with his 12-year-old son Michael.

== Early life ==
Kallinger was born on December 11, 1935, as Joseph Lee Brenner III at the Northern Liberties Hospital in Philadelphia, Pennsylvania to Joseph Lee Brenner Jr. and his wife Judith. His father was a Roman Catholic while his mother was of Jewish heritage. On December 12, 1935, he was placed in foster care after his father had abandoned his mother and she was unable to provide for him. On October 15, 1939, he was adopted by Austrian immigrants Stephen and Anna Kallinger, who could not have biological children of their own.

He was abused by both his adoptive parents so severely that, at the age of six, he suffered a hernia inflicted by his adoptive father. The punishments Kallinger endured included kneeling on jagged rocks, being locked inside closets, consuming excrement, committing self-injury, being burned with irons, being whipped with belts, and being starved. When he was nine, he was sexually assaulted by a group of neighborhood boys.

As a child, Kallinger often rebelled against his teachers and his adoptive parents. He dreamed of becoming a playwright, and had played the part of Ebenezer Scrooge in the local YWCA's performance of A Christmas Carol in the ninth grade. When Kallinger was 15, he began dating a girl, Hilda Bergman, whom he met at a theater he visited on Saturdays. His parents told him not to see her, but he married her and had two children with her.

She later left him because of domestic violence. Kallinger was hospitalized at St. Mary's on September 4, 1957, with severe headaches and loss of appetite, which doctors believed was a result of stress from his divorce. Kallinger remarried on April 20, 1958, and had five children with his second wife. He was extremely abusive towards his family, and often inflicted the same punishments on them that he had suffered from his adoptive parents.

Throughout the next decade, Kallinger spent time in and out of mental institutions due to amnesia, attempted suicide and committing arson.

== Criminal history ==
Kallinger was arrested and imprisoned in 1972 when his children went to the police. While in jail, he had scored 82 on an IQ test and was diagnosed with paranoid schizophrenia, and state psychiatrists recommended that he be supervised with his family. The children later recanted their allegations.

Two years later, one of his children, Joseph Jr., was found dead in an abandoned construction building two weeks after Kallinger took out a large life insurance policy on his sons. Though Kallinger claimed that Joseph Jr had run away from home, the insurance company, suspecting foul play, refused to pay out the claim.

Beginning in June 1974, Kallinger and his 12-year-old son Michael went on a crime spree spanning Philadelphia, Baltimore, and New Jersey. Over the next six weeks, they robbed, assaulted, and sexually abused four families, gaining entrance to each house by pretending to be salesmen. On January 8, 1975, they continued their spree in Leonia, New Jersey. Using a pistol and a knife, they overpowered and tied up the three residents. Then, when others entered the home, they were forced to strip and were bound with cords from lamps and other appliances.

This culminated in the killing of 21-year-old nurse Maria Fasching, the eighth person to arrive. When she refused to follow Kallinger's orders he responded by stabbing her in the neck and back. Another of the residents, still bound, managed to get outside and cry for help. Neighbors saw her and called the police. By the time they arrived the Kallingers had fled, using the city bus as their getaway vehicle and dumping their weapons and a bloody shirt along the way.

== Arrest and imprisonment ==
Police investigated Kallinger after gathering the bloody shirt and eyewitness testimony that he and his son had been seen in the area. They soon found out about Kallinger's history of domestic violence, Joseph Jr.'s unsolved death, and a series of arsons targeted against buildings he owned. Kallinger and his son were arrested on kidnapping and rape charges. Kallinger was eventually charged with three counts of murder for his son Joseph Jr, Maria Fasching, and a neighborhood boy. Kallinger pleaded insanity, claiming God had told him to kill.

He was found sane and sentenced to life in prison on October 14, 1976. Michael, meanwhile, was judged to be under his father's control. He was sentenced to a reformatory. Upon his release at 21, he moved out of state and changed his name. While in prison, Kallinger made several suicide attempts, including attempting to set himself on fire. Because of his suicidal and violent behavior, he was transferred to a mental hospital in Trenton, New Jersey. He was then transferred to a mental hospital in Philadelphia on May 18, 1979.

Flora Rheta Schreiber, the author of the bestselling book Sybil, interviewed Kallinger in jail in 1976. The interview was the basis for a book on the case which was published by Simon & Schuster under the title, The Shoemaker: The Anatomy of a Psychotic in 1983. This book was later part of a Son of Sam lawsuit brought by one of the victim's families as Kallinger received royalties for the book. A judge awarded the family earnings from not only Kallinger, but Schreiber and Simon & Schuster as well, leaving Schreiber nearly $100,000 in personal debt due to expenses of the book's research, including phone calls to Kallinger in prison which totaled $1200 per month for several years. A later appellate panel awarded only Kallinger's royalties to the families.

Michael Korda, editor at Simon & Schuster, said that for many years he received a Christmas card from Kallinger from jail. Schreiber herself grew very close to Kallinger during the writing process, and the two exchanged regular letters and phone calls until Schreiber's death in 1988.

In an interview with Geraldo Rivera, Kallinger admitted to wanting to kill people, including Rivera himself. Upon Rivera saying that he would like for him to never get out of prison, Kallinger responded, "I hope I never do either."

== Death ==
Joseph Kallinger died of heart failure on March 26, 1996, at SCI Cresson. He spent the last 11 years of his life on suicide watch.

== See also ==
- List of serial killers in the United States
