= TOB =

TOB, ToB, or Tob may refer to:

- Tobruk Airport (IATA airport code)
- Dodge Center Airport (FAA LID airport code)
- Tob, a place mentioned in the Bible
- Tournament of Bands
- The Orange Box, a video game compilation
- Traduction œcuménique de la Bible
- Times on base, a baseball statistic
- Total War Saga: Thrones of Britannia, a strategy game set during the Viking invasion of Britain and Ireland
- Tempel ov Blood, Satanic neo-Nazi group
