= KTOB =

KTOB may refer to:

- Dodge Center Airport (ICAO code KTOB)
- KZNB, a radio station (1490 AM) licensed to serve Petaluma, California, United States, which held the call sign KTOB from 1961 to 2014
