= Spiegel =

Spiegel is German, Yiddish, and Dutch for "mirror". More specifically, it may refer to:

== Publications ==
- Der Spiegel, a weekly German magazine
- Der Spiegel (website), the online sibling of Der Spiegel

== Political ==
- Spiegel scandal, a 1962 German political scandal, named after Der Spiegel magazine

== People ==
- Spiegel (surname), a German surname
- Spiegel Grove, the Fremont, Ohio, home of U.S. President Rutherford B. Hayes, named after mirror-like pools of rainwater
- Adriaan van den Spiegel, a Flemish anatomist.

== Fictional characters ==
- Spike Spiegel, the main character of the anime Cowboy Bebop

== Businesses ==
- Spiegel (catalog), an American catalog retailer
- Spiegel, Inc., the former name of the Eddie Bauer Holdings

== Ships ==
- USS Spiegel Grove (LSD-32), a dock landing ship of the United States Navy
- Spiegel, the flagship of Michiel de Ruyter during the Second Anglo-Dutch War

== Music ==
- Spiegel im Spiegel, a piece of music written by Arvo Pärt in 1978
- "Spiegel" (song), a hip hop song by German girl group Tic Tac Toe

== Literature ==
- "Spiegel the Cat", a story-poem by David Martin based on a tale by Gottfried Keller

== Locations ==
- Spiegel bei Koeniz, a village in the Swiss canton of Bern

== Industry ==
- Spiegeleisen, a pig iron containing a high level of manganese used in the manufacture of steel

== Medical ==
- Spigelian hernia, a hernia of the abdominal wall, named after Van den Spiegel

== See also ==
- Spiegeltent
- Spiegle
- Spiegl
