= Harmful to Minors =

2002 book by Judith Levine

- Author: Judith Levine
- Publication date: 2002
- ISBN: 0-8166-4006-8

Harmful to Minors: The Perils of Protecting Children From Sex (ISBN 0-8166-4006-8 [hardcover], ISBN 1-56025-516-1 [paperback]) is a 2002 book by Judith Levine. The foreword was written by former United States Surgeon General Joycelyn Elders, who resigned after suggesting that masturbation be destigmatized as a means of preventing young people from engaging in riskier forms of sexual activity.

The "Author's Note" states: "Most of the research for this book, including interviews, was conducted between 1996 and early 2000, and pertinent statistics were updated in 2001. The names of all nonprofessionals have been fictionalized, along with some identifying characteristics."

In the book, Levine discusses United States laws concerning child pornography, statutory rape, and abortion for minors using a variety of studies and interviews with teenagers and adults alike (see Acknowledgments). Levine also analyzes abstinence-only sex education, which Levine considers counter-productive and dangerous.

The book also examines the terms "harmful to minors" and "indecency," which Levine considers to be umbrella terms for censorship, as well as the Dylan v. Heather case, and the little-known Support Program for Abusive Reactive Kids (SPARK) and Sexual Treatment Education Program and Services (STEP).

Because of its controversial nature and content, it was nearly impossible for Levine to find a publisher—one prospective publisher even called it "radioactive." University of Minnesota Press eventually agreed to publish the book, despite intense criticism.

The book won the 2002 Los Angeles Times Book Award for Current Interest.

In 2003, Thunder's Mouth Press released a trade paperback edition of the book, which includes a new afterword by Levine which details the public response to the book.

== See also ==
- Sex Without Shame
