= Judith Levine =

American activist and writer (born 1952)

Judith Levine (born 1952) is an American author, journalist, civil libertarian and co-founder of the National Writers Union, a trade union of contract and freelance writers, and No More Nice Girls, a group dedicated to promoting abortion rights through street theater. She is a board member of the National Center for Reason and Justice and the Vermont chapter of the ACLU.

Levine has written on sex, gender, aging, consumerism, and culture for dozens of national magazines and newspapers, including Harper's, The New York Times, Vogue, AARP The Magazine, and salon.com. Her column "Poli Psy" in the Vermont weekly Seven Days was named Best Political Column in 2006 by the Association of Alternative Newsweeklies. She also has written columns for New York Woman and oxygen.com.

Levine is best known for her 2002 book Harmful to Minors: The Perils of Protecting Children From Sex, which won the 2002 Los Angeles Times Book Prize and was named by SIECUS, the Sexuality Information and Education Council of the United States, as one of history's most influential books about sexuality.

Levine is also the author of My Enemy, My Love: Women, Men, and the Dilemmas of Gender (originally published as My Enemy, My Love: Man-Hating and Ambivalence in Women’s Lives, 2009), in which she analyzes traditional gender roles and the relationship between misogyny and feminism; Do You Remember Me?: A Father, A Daughter, and a Search for the Self, a memoir of her father's affliction with Alzheimer's disease and a critique of the medicalization of aging; and Not Buying It: My Year Without Shopping, a witty journal in which she examines consumerism and anti-consumerist movements. Not Buying It has been translated into five languages.
