= Deconstruction (disambiguation) =

Deconstruction is a philosophical theory.

Deconstruction or Deconstructed may also refer to:

== Music ==
=== Albums ===
- Deconstructed (Bush album), a 1997 compilation album
- Deconstructed (EP), an EP by Kesha
- Deconstructed (Steve Swallow album), 1997
- Dconstructed, a Disney remix album
- Deconstruction (Meredith Brooks album), a 1999 album by Meredith Brooks
- Deconstruction (Cloroform album), a 1998 album by Cloroform
- Deconstruction (Deconstruction album), an eponymous album released by the rock band Deconstruction in 1994
- Deconstruction (Devin Townsend Project album), a 2011 album by the Devin Townsend Project
- The Deconstruction, a 2018 album by Eels

=== Songs ===
- "Deconstruction", a song by Pitchshifter from their 1992 album, Submit
- "Deconstruction", a song by Nevermore from their 1999 album, Dreaming Neon Black
- "Deconstruction", a song by All Shall Perish from their 2003 album, Hate, Malice, Revenge

=== Other uses in music ===
- Deconstruction (band), a rock band formed by former members of Jane's Addiction
- Deconstruction Records, a UK record label
- Deconstruction Tour, a trans-European punk tour and sports festival
- Deconstructed club, an experimental electronic dance music genre

== Other uses ==
- Deconstruction (building), the process of manually taking down a building
- Deconstruction (fashion)
- Deconstructed cuisine, a style of serving food
- Dimensional deconstruction, a method in theoretical physics to construct d-dimensional theories that behave as higher-dimensional theories in a certain range of energies
- Faith deconstruction, a phenomenon within American evangelicalism

== See also ==
- Construction (disambiguation)
- Deconstructivism, an architectural movement or style
- Positive deconstruction, a methodology in Christian apologetics
