= Dodge Center, Minnesota =

City in Minnesota, United States

- City
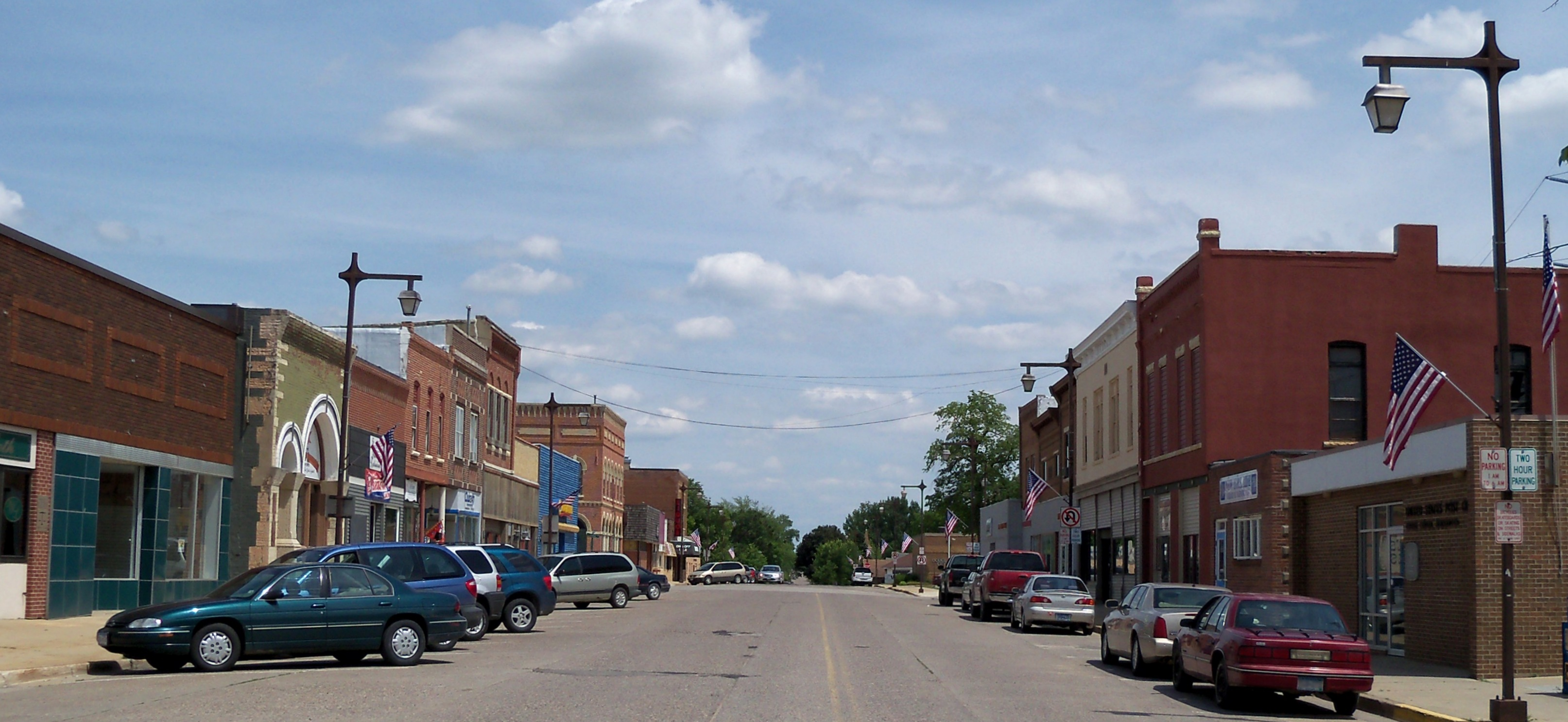
- Downtown Dodge Center
- Nicknames: Dodge, DC
- Motto: "A Solid Foundation"
- Location of Dodge Center within Dodge County and state of Minnesota
- Coordinates: 44°01′44″N 92°51′18″W
- Country: United States
- State: Minnesota
- County: Dodge

Area
  - Total: 2.41 sq mi (6.25 km^{2})
  - Land: 2.41 sq mi (6.25 km^{2})
  - Water: 0 sq mi (0.00 km^{2})
- Elevation: 1,276 ft (389 m)

Population (2020)
  - Total: 2,844
  - Density: 1,179.3/sq mi (455.32/km^{2})
- Time zone: UTC-6 (Central (CST))
  - Summer (DST): UTC-5 (CDT)
- ZIP code: 55927
- Area code: 507
- FIPS code: 27-15994
- GNIS feature ID: 2394540
- Website: www.ci.dodgecenter.mn.us

Dodge Center is a city in Dodge County, Minnesota, United States. As of the 2020 census, its population was 2,844.

== History ==
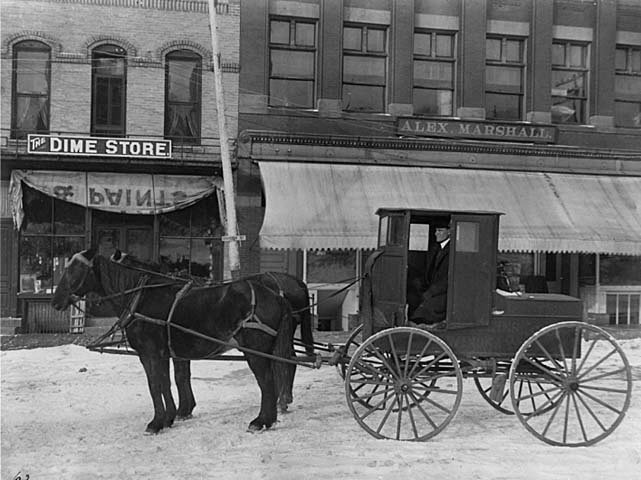
Dodge Center, 1800s

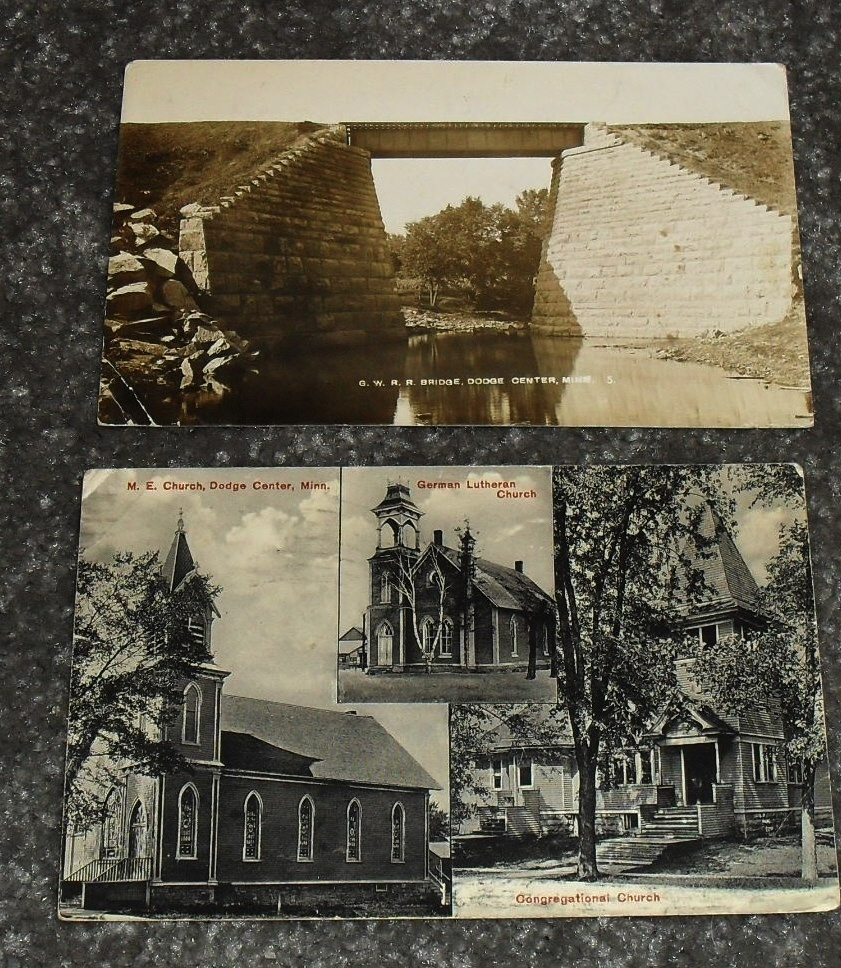
Early 1900s - Dodge Center

Dodge Center, Minnesota

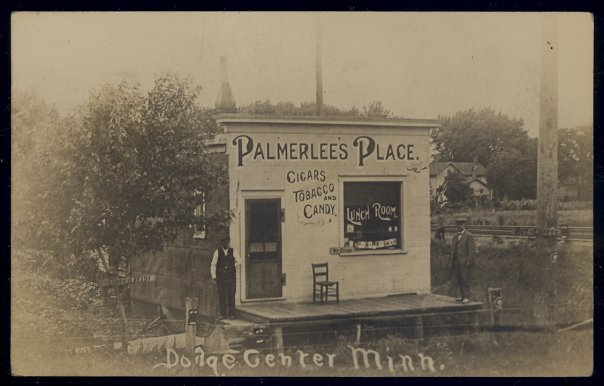
Palmerlee's Place - Dodge Center - 1911

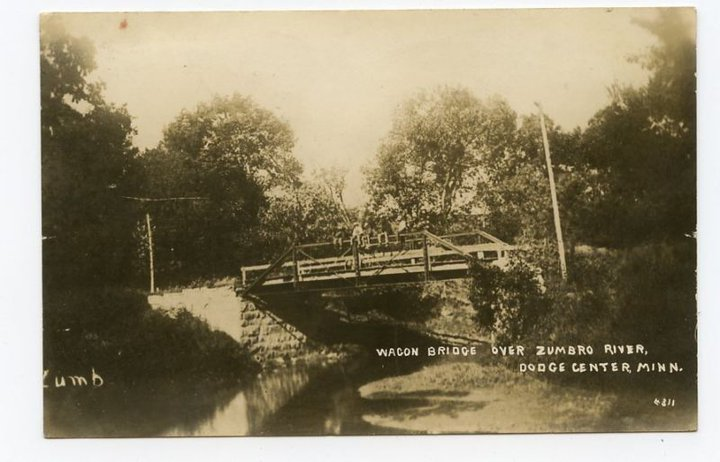
Bridge over Zumbro River in Dodge Center - 1917

The Dodge Center area was first settled by pioneers in the 1850s. The town was created by the railroad system and named for its central location within Dodge County, Minnesota, which was named for Henry Dodge, twice the governor of Wisconsin.

The first train to reach Dodge Center arrived on July 13, 1866. Shortly after, D.L. Tyler moved to Dodge Center from Ashland (which had no railroad) and built its first general store in 1867. Tyler also became the town's first postmaster.

Dodge Center's site was officially platted in 1867 and recorded in July 1869. In January 1870, the legislature passed a bill changing the town's name to Silas. The bill was reconsidered the next day and no further action was taken. The town remained Dodge Center and was incorporated in February 1872 by special act of the legislature.

Early Dodge Center was a farming community known for growing grain. Grain wagons lined up and down Main Street and into the surrounding countryside waiting their turn at either of two grain elevators.

By 1870, Dodge Center's population had grown to 400–500. The two grain elevators, a gun shop, Tyler's general store and The Kinney House (a hotel widely known in the region and later burned) had become established businesses. The Chicago and North Western Railroad depot had also been completed. Also by 1870, the one-room schoolhouse, in which a Mrs. Rice taught, had become too small. Realizing the importance of education, the people of Dodge Center built a wooden, L-shaped, two-story schoolhouse, costing about $15,000. The first high school commencement exercises were held in 1885.[2] When that school was also outgrown, a new brick building was constructed in 1898.

The 1870 school was cut in half and converted. One half became an opera house (where the Assembly of God church now stands) and the other half became apartments directly across the street. The opera house was one of the grandest in southeastern Minnesota, with a large stage, balcony and opera seats. The opera house eventually became a church and was destroyed by fire in 1948. The apartments were demolished in the 1980s.

The 1898 building, at the corner of 1st Ave NW and 3rd Street NW, was used until 1972. A gymnasium, auditorium and two classrooms were added in 1936, part of President Franklin Roosevelt's WPA program. An addition containing a library and home-economics room was added in 1950 and an elementary school building was constructed in 1958. Of the 1890s portion of the building (demolished in 1972), one stairwell and a classroom still exist. The small 1898 portion and the 1936, 1950 and 1958 additions remain standing and are owned by a private entity (as of August 2007); they house apartments with several small businesses. A new high school was erected on the western edge of town in 1972 and is still in use.

Dodge Center's first newspaper, the Dodge Center Press, began publication in 1874. The Dodge Center Star was established in 1890 by Edgar Stivers. The two papers merged in 1936 to become the Dodge Center Star-Record.

Along with the Kinney House, the Windsor Hotel developed a fine reputation throughout the region. A third hotel, the Hartley House, was built just south of the Chicago Great Western station. It burned one night, killing a traveling female teacher.

Dodge Center's first permanent doctor was Steven W. Ranson, who began practicing there in June 1870. He also opened a drug store in 1872. In 1875 Dr. James A. Garver, of Ohio, moved from Wasioja to Dodge Center, where he continued to live and practice the rest of his life.

The Joseph Garrison post of the Grand Army of the Republic was established with 22 charter members in 1885. Garrison was the second man from Dodge County to lose his life in the American Civil War. He died in Libby Prison of wounds suffered in the Battle of Bull Run.

A large three-story roller mill was built in 1887. It had a national reputation for the fine quality of its flour and won first prize at the Chicago World's Fair in 1893. The mill and its brand were later sold. It was later destroyed by fire.

The Minnesota and Northwestern Railroad came to Dodge Center in 1885, the name being changed to Chicago Great Western in 1892. The track ran from Minneapolis, MN to Oelwein, IA. The last section of track to be completed was the long trestle across the Zumbro River, north of Dodge Center.

Religion had an early start in Dodge Center. The Seventh Day Baptists organized in 1859 and the settlers erected a building in 1865. They moved it into the village of Dodge Center and dedicated it in 1873. Today, Dodge Center continues this seventh day tradition with the modern Dodge Center Seventh-day Adventist Church.

The Sunday Baptists built a church in 1874 in the southern part of the village. A tornado demolished the building in 1880.

The Methodist Church was constructed in 1878 and was used by the congregation until 1958 when it moved into the current building. The Congregational Church community began to move to Dodge Center from Wasioja, Minnesota in 1875.

== Geography ==
According to the United States Census Bureau, the city has a total area of 2.08 square miles (5.39 km^{2}), all land.

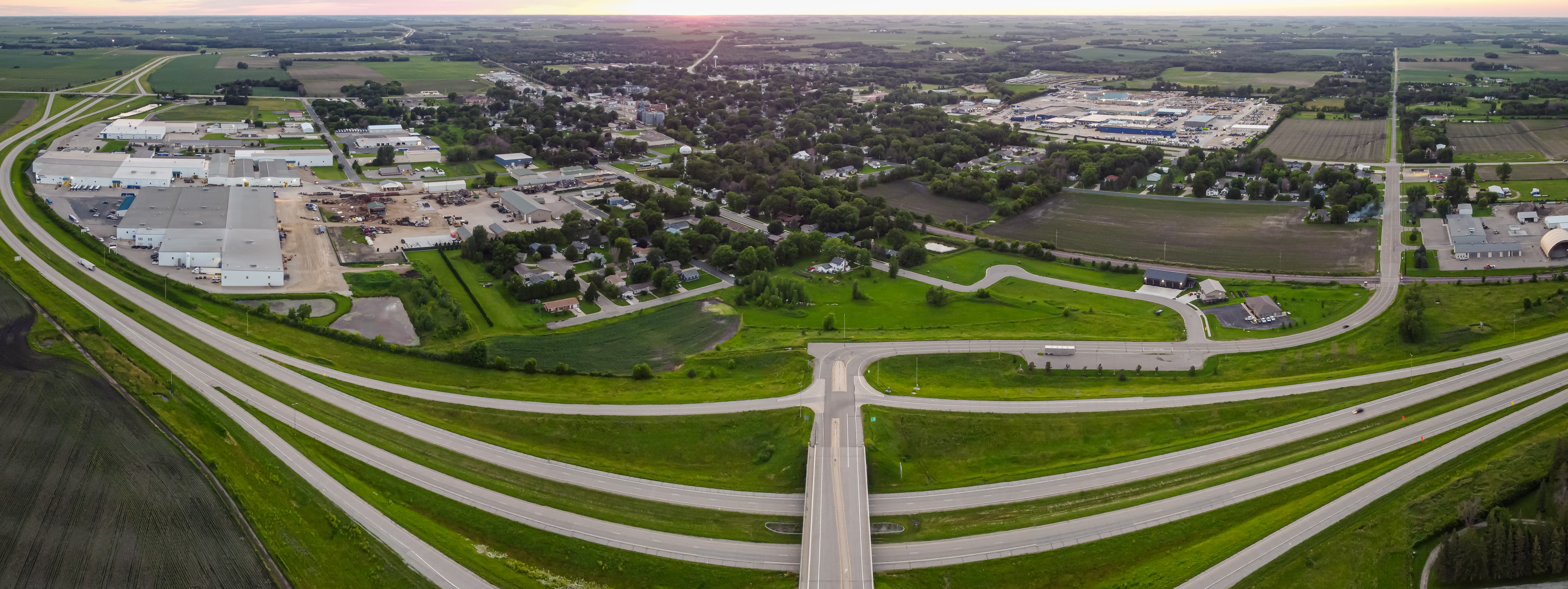

== Demographics ==
Historical population
Census	Pop.	Note	%±
1880	726		—
1890	633		−12.8%
1900	942		48.8%
1910	957		1.6%
1920	921		−3.8%
1930	854		−7.3%
1940	1,029		20.5%
1950	1,151		11.9%
1960	1,441		25.2%
1970	1,603		11.2%
1980	1,816		13.3%
1990	1,954		7.6%
2000	2,226		13.9%
2010	2,670		19.9%
2020	2,844		6.5%
U.S. Decennial Census

Dodge Center is part of the Rochester, MN Metropolitan Statistical Area.

=== 2020 census ===
As of the 2020 census, Dodge Center had a population of 2,844. The median age was 34.1 years. 28.1% of residents were under the age of 18 and 13.0% of residents were 65 years of age or older. For every 100 females there were 102.1 males, and for every 100 females age 18 and over there were 100.6 males age 18 and over.

0.0% of residents lived in urban areas, while 100.0% lived in rural areas.

There were 1,057 households in Dodge Center, of which 37.7% had children under the age of 18 living in them. Of all households, 48.9% were married-couple households, 18.8% were households with a male householder and no spouse or partner present, and 21.6% were households with a female householder and no spouse or partner present. About 25.4% of all households were made up of individuals and 8.7% had someone living alone who was 65 years of age or older.

There were 1,119 housing units, of which 5.5% were vacant. The homeowner vacancy rate was 2.3% and the rental vacancy rate was 5.2%.

Racial composition as of the 2020 census
Race	Number	Percent
White	2,386	83.9%
Black or African American	31	1.1%
American Indian and Alaska Native	27	0.9%
Asian	32	1.1%
Native Hawaiian and Other Pacific Islander	1	0.0%
Some other race	172	6.0%
Two or more races	195	6.9%
Hispanic or Latino (of any race)	362	12.7%

=== 2010 census ===
As of the census of 2010, there were 2,670 people, 998 households, and 659 families residing in the city. The population density was 1,283.7 inhabitants per square mile (495.6/km^{2}). There were 1,061 housing units at an average density of 510.1 per square mile (197.0/km^{2}). The racial makeup of the city was 93.0% White, 0.4% African American, 0.4% Native American, 0.7% Asian, 3.9% from other races, and 1.5% from two or more races. Hispanic or Latino of any race were 9.7% of the population.

There were 998 households, of which 40.4% had children under the age of 18 living with them, 49.2% were married couples living together, 11.2% had a female householder with no husband present, 5.6% had a male householder with no wife present, and 34.0% were non-families. 26.0% of all households were made up of individuals, and 11.4% had someone living alone who was 65 years of age or older. The average household size was 2.62 and the average family size was 3.19.

The median age in the city was 31.8 years. 29.8% of residents were under the age of 18; 8.7% were between the ages of 18 and 24; 28.7% were from 25 to 44; 20.3% were from 45 to 64; and 12.5% were 65 years of age or older. The gender makeup of the city was 49.3% male and 50.7% female.

=== 2000 census ===
As of the census of 2000, there were 2,226 people, 824 households, and 588 families residing in the city. The population density was 1,173.8 inhabitants per square mile (453.2/km^{2}). There were 859 housing units at an average density of 452.9 per square mile (174.9/km^{2}). The racial makeup of the city was 93.13% White, 0.31% African American, 0.27% Native American, 0.22% Asian, 4.76% from other races, and 1.30% from two or more races. Hispanic or Latino of any race were 6.29% of the population.

There were 824 households, out of which 42.0% had children under the age of 18 living with them, 53.0% were married couples living together, 12.9% had a female householder with no husband present, and 28.6% were non-families. 23.5% of all households were made up of individuals, and 11.0% had someone living alone who was 65 years of age or older. The average household size was 2.61 and the average family size was 3.03.

In the city, the population was spread out, with 30.2% under the age of 18, 8.4% from 18 to 24, 29.7% from 25 to 44, 17.6% from 45 to 64, and 14.1% who were 65 years of age or older. The median age was 32 years. For every 100 females, there were 91.1 males. For every 100 females age 18 and over, there were 88.0 males.

The median income for a household in the city was $39,453, and the median income for a family was $44,632. Males had a median income of $31,525 versus $24,485 for females. The per capita income for the city was $16,858. About 8.0% of families and 9.3% of the population were below the poverty line, including 11.0% of those under age 18 and 10.2% of those age 65 or over.

== Economy ==
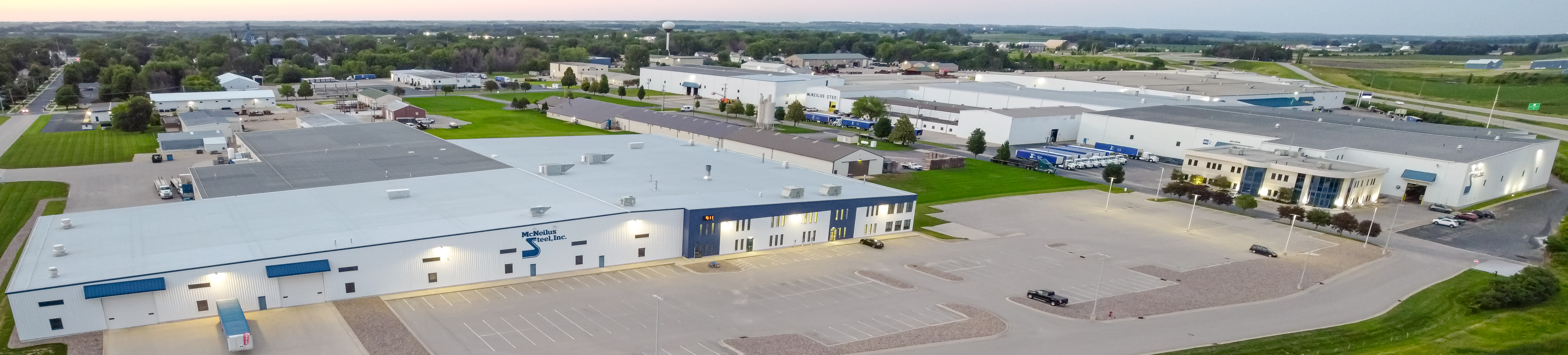
McNeilus in Dodge Center

The largest employer in Dodge Center is McNeilus, a manufacturer of ready-mixed concrete mixer trucks, garbage trucks, and related apparatus. McNeilus is a division of Oshkosh Corporation.

== Education ==
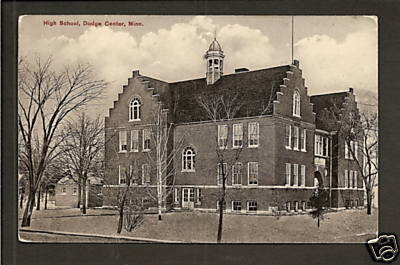
Dodge Center High School - 1908

Dodge Center High School held its first commencement exercises in 1885. A new brick building opened in 1898 and was used until 1972. One stairwell and a classroom still exist from the original building. A gymnasium, auditorium and two classrooms (also still standing) were added in 1936, part of President Franklin D. Roosevelt's Works Progress Administration program. An addition containing a library and home-economics room was added in 1950 and an elementary school building was constructed in 1958. The entire structure is now owned by a private entity and houses apartments with several small businesses.

Dodge Center chose the name "Dodgers" as its nickname and mascot. School colors were maroon and gold until the 1930s, when they were changed to green and white. The first school annual, The Dodger Digest, was published in 1948. It later became known as the Centerite.

In 1990, Dodge Center's school district merged with the towns of Claremont, MN and West Concord, MN to form Triton Public Schools. Dodge Center is now home to Triton Primary, Triton Middle School and Triton Senior High School. The first commencement exercises were held in 1991.

Triton's school mascot is the Cobra. The school colors are maroon and gray. The annual yearbook is titled Triton Tradition and the first volume was published in 1991.

Triton High School was remodeled with an addition completed in 1998 that included an additional gymnasium and a new elementary school. A middle school was added in 2009. More additions to the school followed in 2012 as the Triton communities continued to grow.

Dodge Center is also home to the Maranatha Adventist Christian school, which serves students grades 1–8 in a modern facility near the Dodge Center Seventh-day Adventist Church.

== School athletics ==
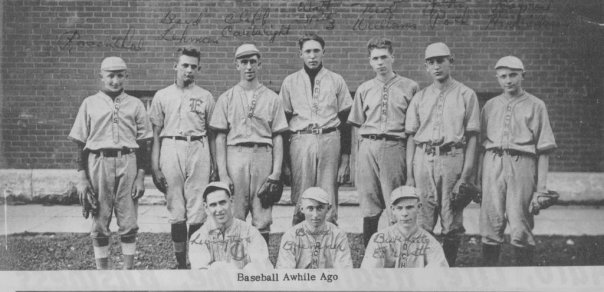
Dodge Center High School Baseball Team -- Early 1900s

In 1952, the Dodge Center football team became one of six Minnesota high school teams to not allow a single point in a season.

The Triton Cobras, coached by Don Henderson, won the Minnesota State Football championship in 1994 (B Division), 2000 (AA Division) and in 2006 (AA Division). In 2006, Triton's football team won every game in the AA Division. The 2006 Cobras hold a Minnesota State High School League Prep Bowl record for both the highest scoring team in a championship game (70 points), as well as total scoring game for both teams (91 points). Two members of the 1994 state championship team also hold individual Minnesota State High School League Prep Bowl records: Kirk Midthun ('96) for most touchdown passes (6) and Judge Gisslen ('95) for most touchdown receptions (4 -- record since tied). Kirk Midthun was voted the Associated Press Minnesota Player of the Year in 1994 and 1995 (a co-winner with Tim Rosga of Cretin Derham Hall).

The Triton athletic fields are named for former Dodge Center High School football coach, Wally Hitt.

== Dodge Country Club ==
Dodge Center is home to Dodge Country Club. Founded in the late 1960s, it is located on the West side of the city. Dodge Country Club is an 18-hole, executive length public golf course. The course, as well as its club house, is a regular social gathering place for those throughout the region. A neighborhood began developing around Dodge Country Club in the 1970s and continues to develop today as both the course and Triton schools prosper.

== Natalie Webb Aquatic Center ==
The Natalie Webb Aquatic Center was opened in 2008 and is named for Natalie (Thornton) Webb, who was a 1999 Triton Alumna, Miss Dodge Center and former Dodge Center YMCA Pool lifeguard and manager. The community felt a loss when she succumbed to a brave struggle against cancer in 2004. This space was named in her honor due to her passion for swimming and lifeguarding in Dodge Center. The community raised money and built the Natalie Webb Aquatic Center to remember and honor Natalie's spirit. It is enjoyed by people throughout the region.

== Transportation ==
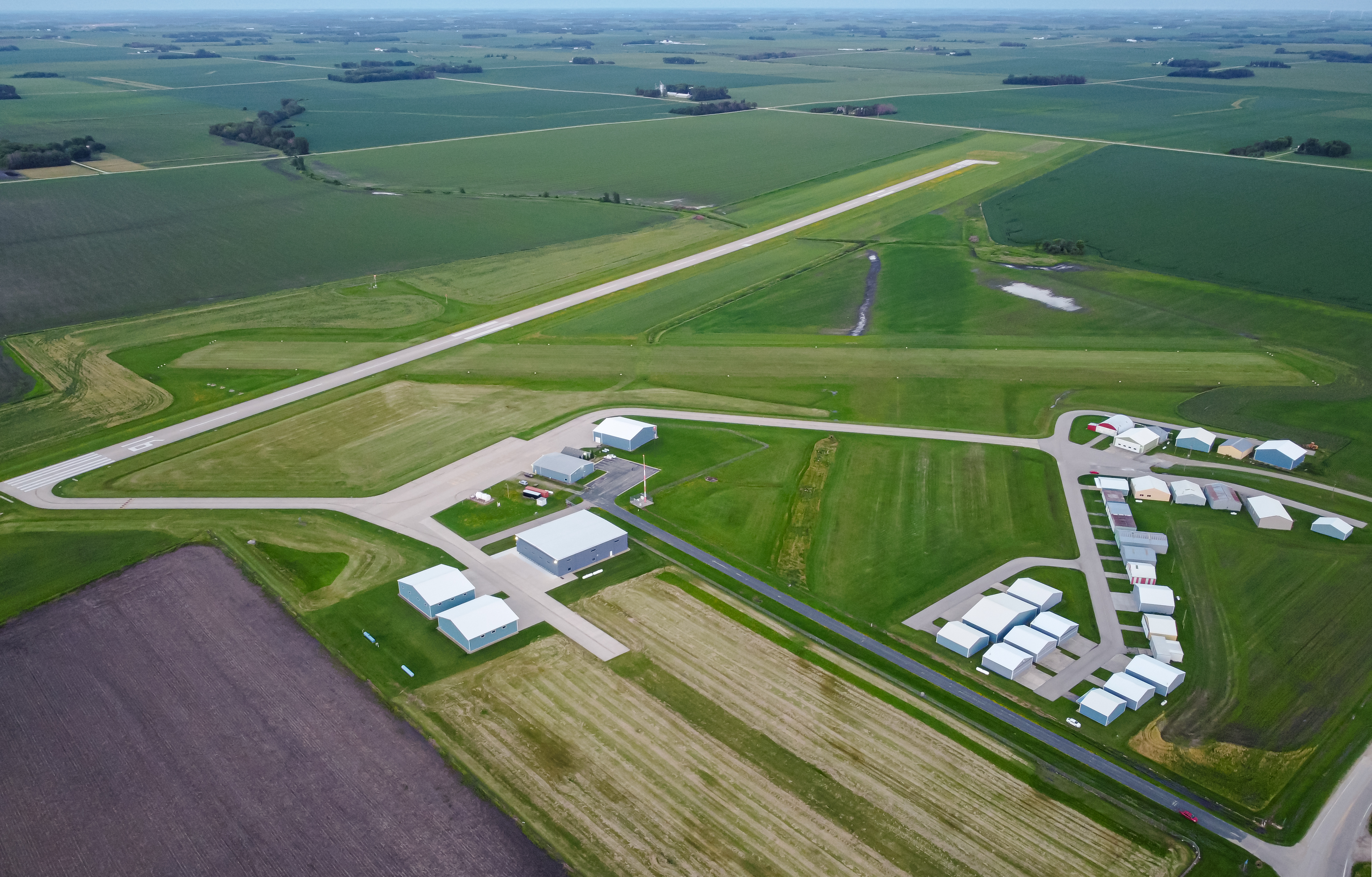
Dodge Center Airport

U.S. Highway 14 and Minnesota State Highway 56 are two of the main routes in the city. Dodge Center Airport (TOB) is located in the city.

The city is located along the mainline of the Dakota, Minnesota and Eastern Railroad, a subsidiary of Canadian Pacific. This east–west line had been owned by the Chicago and North Western Railway until the 1980s when DM&E was formed. Dodge Center also used to be on the Chicago Great Western mainline which ran south from St. Paul down through Iowa and across to Chicago, Illinois. However, the CGW right-of-way has since been abandoned. There were at least three train stations built in the town over the years. Two of these still exist, though they have been repurposed.

== Notable people ==
- Milton L. Humason, astronomer
- Perry Greeley Holden, agronomist
- Shirley Ardell Mason, psychiatric patient and agoraphobic artist
