= Miriam Schneid =

Israeli-Canadian poet and educator

- מרים שנייד
- Born: Miriam Goldschmidt; December 9, 1923; Lutsk, Soviet Union
- Died: September 20, 2012 (aged 88); Toronto, Ontario, Canada
- Education: Hebrew University of Jerusalem
- Spouse: Dr. Otto Schneid (m. 1945; died 1974) Rabbi Dr. Arieh Ofseyer (m. 1976; died 1997) Miklos Emhecht (m. 1998)
- Writing career
- Language: Hebrew
- Genre: Poetry

Miriam Schneid-Ofseyer (Hebrew: מרים שנייד־אופזיהר; December 9, 1923 – September 20, 2012) was an Israeli-Canadian poet and educator.

Born in Lutsk, Soviet Union, Schneid immigrated with her family to Hebron in 1926. Her father was murdered in the 1929 massacre, and she (then five years old) and her mother were severely injured. They moved to Jerusalem, where she afterwards graduated from the Mizrahi Teachers' Seminary and the Hebrew University. She later emigrated to Toronto.

== Publications ==
- Roman be-mikhtavim [A Novel in Love Letters]. Jerusalem: Hotsaʼat ʻAmud. 1949.
- ʻAd tom: shirim [To the End]. Tel Aviv: Hotsa'at Maḥberot le-sifrut. 1959.
- Shire stav [Songs of Autumn]. Tel Aviv: Hotsa'at Maḥberot le-sifrut. 1968.
- Sheʻat ratson [Hour of Desire]. Jerusalem: Reʼuven Mas. 1973.
- Lilakh [Lilac]. Tel Aviv: Traklin. 1976. With Naftali (Otto) Schneid.
- Lilac: Love Poems Exchanged. Toronto: Source Books. 1976. ISBN 0-919552-59-5. Translation of Lilakh.
- Li-leyovah be-ahavah [To My Husband with Love]. Tel Aviv: Traklin. 1978.
- Yeraḥ ha-devosh [The Honeymoon]. Tel Aviv: Traklin. 1979.
- The Honeymoon: Love Poems to My Husband. Toronto: Source Books. 1979. ISBN 0-919552-61-7. Translation of Yeraḥ ha-devosh.
- Helma, Isabel, ed. (1984). To My Husband with Love. Translated by Ofseyer, Arieh L. (2nd ed.). Toronto: Source Books. Translation of Li-leyovah be-ahavah.
- Meinem Gatten in Liebe (in German). Translated by Kleer, Helga. Toronto: Source Books. 1985. Translation of Li-leyovah be-ahavah.
- Megilat Elifele le-Shin Shalom. Tel Aviv: Eked. 1991.
- Windows of Sun. Toronto: Source Books. 1994.
- Twilight. Toronto: Source Books. 1996. ISBN 0-919552-70-6.
