= In Pieces =

In Pieces may refer to:

== Music ==
- In Pieces (Garth Brooks album), 1993
- In Pieces (Chlöe album), 2023
- "In Pieces" (song), 2007, by Shannon Noll
- "In Pieces", a 2007 song by Linkin Park from Minutes to Midnight
- "In Pieces", a 2019 album by Rynx

== Media ==
- In Pieces (film), a 2010 Moroccan documentary
- In Pieces (memoir), 2018 autobiography of actress Sally Field

== See also ==
- Piece (disambiguation)
- Breakdown (disambiguation)
- Breakup, in relationships
- Break Up (disambiguation)
- Deconstruction (disambiguation)
