= Shirley Ardell Mason =

American art teacher (1923–1998)

- Born: January 25, 1923; Dodge Center, Minnesota, U.S.
- Died: February 26, 1998 (aged 75); Lexington, Kentucky, U.S.
- Other name: Sybil Isabel Dorsett
- Occupation: Commercial artist
- Known for: Having dissociative identity disorder

Shirley Ardell Mason (January 25, 1923 – February 26, 1998) was an American art teacher who was reported to have dissociative identity disorder (then known as multiple personality disorder). Her life was purportedly described, with adaptations to protect her anonymity, in 1973 in the book Sybil, subtitled The True Story of a Woman Possessed by 16 Separate Personalities. Two films of the same name were made, one released in 1976 and the other in 2007. Both the book and the films used the name Sybil Isabel Dorsett to protect Mason's identity, though the 2007 remake stated Mason's name at its conclusion.

Mason's diagnosis and treatment under Cornelia B. Wilbur have been criticized, with allegations that Wilbur manipulated or misdiagnosed Mason. Mason herself eventually told her doctor that she did not have multiple personalities and that the symptoms had not been genuine.

== Biography ==
Shirley Mason was born and raised in Dodge Center, Minnesota, the only surviving child of Walter Wingfield Mason (a carpenter and architect) and Martha Alice "Mattie" Atkinson.

In regard to Mason's mother: "...many people in Dodge Center say Mattie"—"Hattie" in the book—"was bizarre", according to Bettie Borst Christensen, who grew up across the street. "She had a witch-like laugh.... She didn't laugh much, but when she did, it was like a screech." Christensen remembers Mason's mother walking around after dark, looking in the neighbors' windows. At one point, Martha Mason was reportedly diagnosed with schizophrenia.

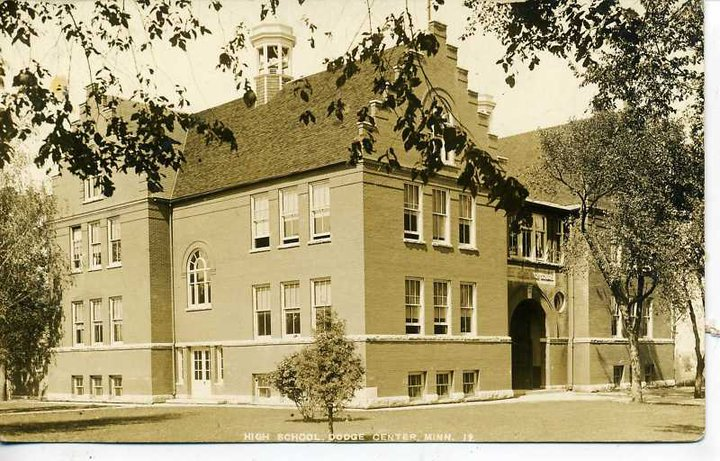
Dodge Center High School, which Mason attended, near her childhood home

Shirley Mason graduated from Dodge Center High School in 1941 and became an art student at Mankato State College, now Minnesota State University, Mankato. In the early 1950s, she was a substitute teacher and a student at Columbia University. She had long suffered from blackouts and emotional breakdowns, and finally entered psychotherapy with Cornelia B. Wilbur, a Freudian psychiatrist. Their sessions together are the basis for Flora Schreiber's book on Shirley Mason. From 1970 to 1971, she taught art at Rio Grande College in Rio Grande, Ohio (now the University of Rio Grande).

Some people in Mason's hometown, reading the book, recognized Mason as Sybil. By that time, Mason had severed nearly all ties with her past and was living in West Virginia. She later moved to Lexington, Kentucky, where she lived near Wilbur. She taught art classes at a community college and ran an art gallery out of her home for many years.

Wilbur diagnosed Mason with breast cancer in 1990, and she declined treatment; it later went into remission. The following year, Wilbur developed Parkinson's disease, and Mason moved into Wilbur's house to take care of her until Wilbur's death in 1992. Mason was a devout Seventh-day Adventist. When her breast cancer returned, Mason gave away her books and paintings to friends. She left the rest of her estate to a Seventh-day Adventist TV minister. Mason died on February 26, 1998.

Over one hundred paintings were found locked in a closet in Mason's Lexington home when it was being emptied after her estate sale. These paintings, often referred to as the "Hidden Paintings", span the years 1943, eleven years before starting psychotherapy with Wilbur, to 1965, the year that Wilbur diagnosed her as having her alternate personalities integrated. Several of the paintings were signed by Mason.

== Sybil ==
Flora Rheta Schreiber's non-fiction book Sybil: The True Story of a Woman Possessed by 16 Separate Personalities told a version of Mason's story with names and details changed to protect her anonymity. In 1998, Sigmund Freud historian Peter J. Swales discovered Sybil's true identity. Schreiber's book, whose veracity was challenged (e.g., Sybil Exposed by Debbie Nathan), stated that Mason had multiple personalities as a result of severe child sexual abuse at the hands of her mother, who, Wilbur believed, had schizophrenia.

The book was made into a TV movie, starring Sally Field and Joanne Woodward, in 1976. The TV movie was remade in 2007 with Tammy Blanchard and Jessica Lange.

== Diagnosis ==
Mason's diagnosis has been challenged. Psychiatrist Herbert Spiegel saw Mason for several sessions while Wilbur was on vacation and felt that Wilbur was manipulating Mason into behaving as though she had multiple personalities when she did not. Spiegel suspected Wilbur of having publicized Mason's case for financial gain. According to Spiegel, Wilbur's client was a hysteric, but did not exhibit multiple personalities. In fact, he later stated that Mason denied to him that she was "multiple" but claimed that Wilbur wanted her to exhibit other personalities.

According to Spiegel, he confronted Wilbur, who responded that the publisher would not publish the book unless it were what she said it was.

Spiegel revealed that he had audio tapes in which Wilbur told Mason about some of the other personalities she had already seen in prior sessions. Spiegel believes these tapes are the "smoking gun" proving that Wilbur induced her client to believe she was multiple. Spiegel made these claims 24 years later, after Schreiber, Wilbur, and Mason had all died, and he was finally asked about the topic.

In August 1998, psychologist Robert Rieber of John Jay College of Criminal Justice stated that the tapes belonged to him and that Wilbur had given them to him decades earlier. He cited the tapes to challenge Mason's diagnosis. Rieber had never interviewed or treated Mason but asserted that she was an "extremely suggestible hysteric." He claimed Wilbur had manipulated Mason in order to secure a book deal.

In a review of Rieber's book, psychiatrist Mark Lawrence asserts that Rieber repeatedly distorted the evidence and left out a number of important facts about Mason's case to advance his case against the validity of the diagnosis.

Debbie Nathan's Sybil Exposed draws upon an archive of Schreiber's papers stored at John Jay College of Criminal Justice and other first-hand sources. Nathan claims that Wilbur, Mason, and Schreiber knowingly perpetrated a fraud, describes the purported manipulation of Wilbur by Mason and vice versa, and argues that the case created an "industry" of repressed memory. Nathan hypothesizes that Mason's physical and sensory issues may have been due to untreated pernicious anemia, the symptoms of which were mistaken at the time for psychogenic issues. She notes that after Mason was treated with calf's-liver supplements for chronic blood disorders as a child and young woman, her psychological symptoms likewise went into remission for years at a time, and that Wilbur herself noted that "Sybil" suffered from pernicious anemia later in life. Nathan's writing and her research methods have been publicly criticized by Mason's family and by Dr. Patrick Suraci, who was personally acquainted with Shirley Mason.

In addition, Suraci claims that Spiegel behaved unethically by withholding tapes that supposedly proved that Wilbur had induced Mason to believe she had multiple personalities. Spiegel also claimed to have filmed himself hypnotizing Mason, supposedly proving that Wilbur had "implanted false memories" in her mind, but when Suraci asked to see the films, Spiegel said he had lost them. Although Wilbur's papers were destroyed, copies and excerpts within Flora Rheta Schreiber's papers at the Lloyd Sealy Library of John Jay College were unsealed in 1998.

In 2013, Nancy Preston published After Sybil, a personal memoir which includes facsimile reproductions of Mason's personal letters to her, along with color plates of her paintings. According to Preston, Mason taught art at Ohio's Rio Grande College, where Preston was a student. The two became close friends and corresponded until a few days before Mason's death. In the letters, Mason claimed to have multiple personalities.
