= Spiegler =

Spiegler is a surname. Notable persons with that name include:

- Franz Joseph Spiegler (1691–1757), German painter
- Gerhard Spiegler (1929–2015), American academic
- Marc Spiegler (born 1968), French-American art journalist
- Mark Spiegler, American pornographic talent agent
- Mordechai Spiegler (born 1944), Israeli footballer

== See also ==
- Spiegel (surname)
- Spiegelmann
- Spiegelman
