= Triton Senior High School =

Triton High School

Location
- 813 W Hwy St; Dodge Center, Minnesota 55927; United States; 44°1′56″N 92°51′58″W

Information
- Type: High School
- Established: 1990
- School district: 2125
- Teaching staff: 22.30 (FTE)
- Grades: 9–12
- Enrollment: 283 (2024-2025)
- Student to teacher ratio: 12.69
- Colors: Maroon and Grey
- Mascot: Cobra
- Yearbook: Tradition

Triton High School is a public school in Dodge Center, Minnesota, United States.

== History ==
Triton Senior High was established in 1990 when the communities of Dodge Center, West Concord and Claremont consolidated to create one high school and junior high school. The newly created high school was housed in the former Dodge Center High School building and the junior high school was housed in the former West Concord High School building. Each town continued to operate separate elementary schools. The first Triton High School commencement was held in June 1991.

Triton's mascot is the Cobra and colors are maroon and grey. The Cobra mascot and school colors were created when Dodge Center and Claremont High Schools partnered for basketball, baseball and softball during the 1989-1990 school year. Colors were created by combining both schools' main colors: green (Dodge Center) and orange (Claremont), which resulted in maroon; then secondary colors: white (Dodge Center) with black (Claremont), resulting in grey. The Cobra was created by collaboration of two (co). Upon official consolidation of Dodge Center, West Concord and Claremont in 1990, the 6th–11th grade students in each town voted to name the school "Triton" and retain the Cobra mascot, as well as colors of maroon and grey. Other options for school names were: Tritown, West Dodgemont, Dodge Westmont, Dodge County West and Tri-Community High School.

A bond referendum was passed in 1996 to build an addition to the high school building in Dodge Center, adding Triton Primary School and additional high school space, which opened in the fall of 1998. Later, Triton relocated its junior high (middle school) from West Concord to Dodge Center and officially opened in the fall of 2009. Additional space was added and renovations were made in 2012 as the Triton community continued to grow.

== Senior Seminar ==
Triton offers many successful programs. For example, Senior Seminar is a class taken in the final semester of high school. The class reinforces seniors' life skills, such as financial planning and job interviewing techniques. This class must be passed in order for students to graduate. Through this class, students also complete a project wherein students must write a paper, complete a project, then present their findings to a board of faculty and community members.

== Athletics ==
The Triton football field is named for former Dodge Center High School football coach, Wally Hitt. The facility is notoriously nicknamed "The Snake Pit."

The Triton Cobras Football program, won the Minnesota State Football Championship in 1994 (B Division); 2000 (AA Division) and 2006 (AA Division), all during Don Henderson's tenure as Head Coach (1990-2017).

- 1994: Triton's football team went undefeated in Class B (14-0)
  - Two members of the 1994 state championship team also hold individual Minnesota State High School League Prep Bowl records: Judge Gisslen '95, for Most Receiving Touchdowns, which was 4, and Most Points, which was 26, and Kirk Midthun ('96), for Most Passing Touchdowns and Most Touchdowns (Rush/Receive/Pass/Kickoff Return), with 6 for both.
  - Kirk Midthun was voted the Associated Press Minnesota Player of the Year in 1994 and 1995 (a co-winner with Tim Rosga of Cretin Derham Hall).
- 2006: Triton's football team again went undefeated in Class AA (13-0).
  - The 2006 Cobras hold a Minnesota State High School League Prep Bowl record for the highest scoring team in a championship game (70 points), and broke the record for total scoring game for both teams (91 points).
  - Triton Football has the state record of most points scored in a season. In 2006, the Cobras averaged 51.3 points a game.
- The boys' basketball team has managed various tournament wins over the years. They were Section Runners-Up in 2008 and 2AA Champions for the first time in school history in 2009, both teams were coached by Jason Boe.
- The girls' basketball team won the conference championship in 1991–92.
- The girls' softball team won the conference championship in 1991–92.
- The Triton wrestling team has had 22 wrestlers go to the state wrestling tournament.
- Triton track has sent 42 athletes in 15 different events to the state meet. In 2022 Owen Petersohn became the first Triton athlete to win the state championship in an individual sport, taking first place in both the 110m and 300m hurdles.
- Triton has offered boys' golf since 1991 and girls' golf since 1993. Triton’s had three people go on to state.
- Triton has offered dance line as a girls' winter sport since 2008.

== Arts and organizations ==
Triton High School offers a variety of clubs and organizations.

The Triton High School band is an outstanding program. On average there are 80 high school students who participate in band. There are 15 instruments that are routinely played in this band. There are two different level bands for the high school students: symphonic band and concert band. Triton also has a jazz band and a pep band.

Triton High School choir excels under the direction of Mr. Craig Anderson. Former faculty at Claremont High School, Craig is a founding faculty member of Triton. He and his students have won many state awards and are continually invited to choral contests throughout the region.

Triton Theater was established by Mr. John Schreiber in 1990 and is held in high regard by the Triton community (and beyond). Mr. Schreiber is well known for his one-act plays (several state honors) and spring musicals, in which many Triton students were eager to participate. John's daughter, Anne (Wotherspoon), continues the tradition as an English teacher and theater director at Triton. Since 1993, Triton's one-act has been named a "starring production" multiple years in the conference's annual one-act festival, has advanced to section finals in the Minnesota State High School League's one-act competition, and has performed in the state festival twice. A modern theater / Performing Arts Center was added to Triton High School in 2014. Many advocate for the theater to be named for the Schreiber family and their contributions, "The Schreiber Theater."

The 2003-2004 school year was the 1st year for Link Crew. Link Crew is a program to help freshmen and new students with their transition to high school. Link Crew is made up of about 20 juniors and seniors who are leaders in the school. These student leaders host events all year with the freshmen to improve school spirit.

Math League is a fun competition where students go to other schools to compete with math questions. The math topics are algebra, geometry, trigonometry, algebra 2, and pre-calc.

E.A.R.T.H. stands for Environmental Awareness and Responsibility at Triton High. In E.A.R.T.H., students organize all the recycling at Triton, adopt highways, do special things for Earth during Earth week, sponsor cell phone drives and clean up the football stands after home games.

BPA: Business Professionals of America began in 2009 and became a new addition to Triton High School. BPA helps with practical skills related to business. Students in BPA compete in 60 different events.

There are many FFA (National FFA Organization) contests, ranging from animal judging to crop judging to mechanics. The FFA grows a garden in West Concord in order to sell the produce. They also show animals in the county fairs and the Minnesota State Fair.

Knowledge Bowl is actually a series of interdisciplinary contests where students compete in written and oral rounds by answering questions to all areas of learning. Questions test students' recall, problem solving, and critical thinking skills.
