= Natan Spigel =

Polish painter (1892–1942)

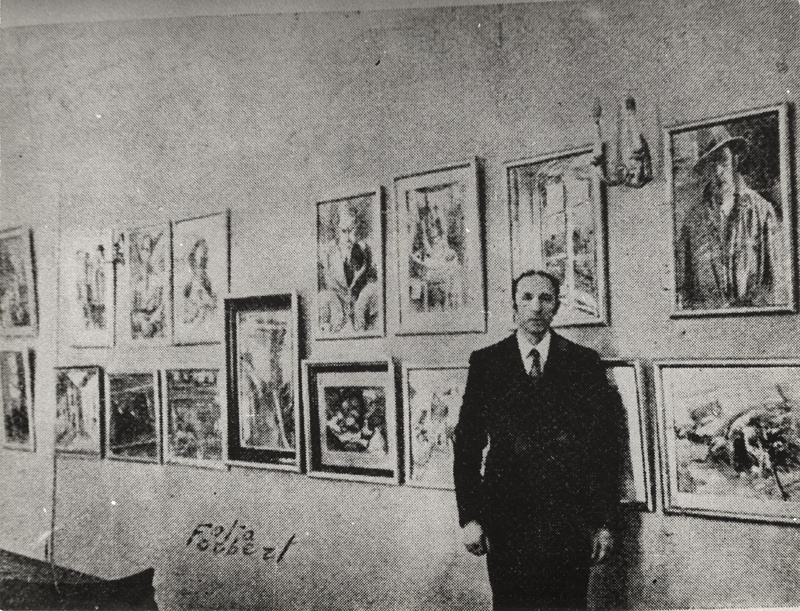
- Born: 1886; Łódź, Russian Empire
- Died: 1942; Treblinka extermination camp
- Movement: Realism, Expressionism

Natan Spigel (also: Nathan, Szpigiel/Spiegel/Szpigel) (1892–1942) was a Jewish painter born in Poland. Spigel was a key member of the influential Expressionist group Yung-yidish. He exhibited his works throughout Europe until his internment in Radomsko ghetto in 1939. Natan was murdered in Treblinka in 1942, and only about 20 of his works survived the Shoah-Holocaust.

== Life and artistic career ==
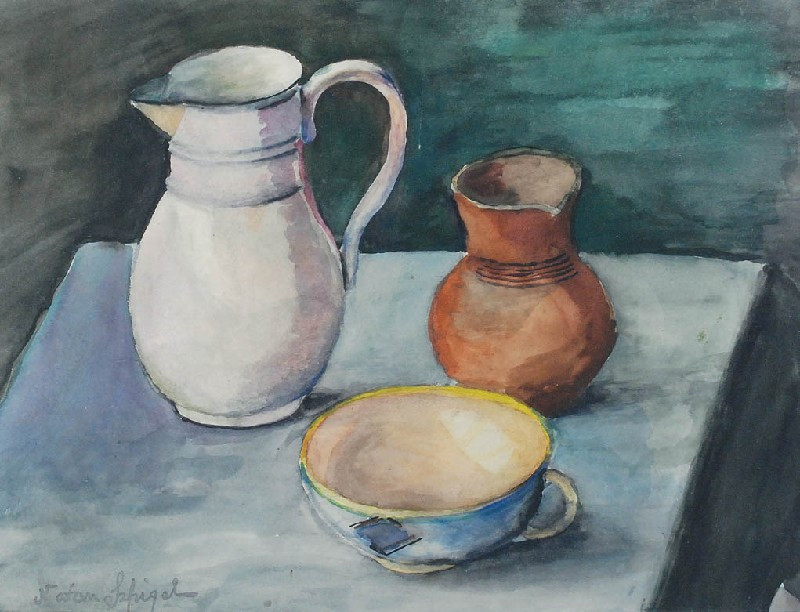
A paint by Spigel

Natan Spigel was born into an Orthodox Jewish family in Łódź, now in Poland, in 1892. ( see autobiographic letter to Prof. Otto Schneid). The remnants of his family are now based in London. He studied art as a young man and then in 1910 traveled to Rome on sponsorship, where he continued his studies with Henryk Glicenstein. His first major success, in Paris, was the invitation to show in the 1924 Salon d'Automne, although his first public exhibition was in Łódź in 1921. He was invited to exhibit in London at the Ben Uri Gallery in 1930 and also, at a joint exhibition with Jacob Epstein. In Poland Natan Spigel was regularly exhibiting his work, with shows in Łódź, Kraków and Warsaw (1921, 1928 & 1937).

Spigel considered himself a Jewish painter, and his painting reflected this focus, depicting scenes of Jewish life in Poland, as well as portraits and still-life, in both watercolours and oils. A particularly distinctive feature of some of his watercolours was his use of varnish to give age and contrast. Spigel was a key member of the Expressionist group Jung Idysz. He was also a member of ‘Start’, a group of mainly Jewish, Łódź artists, who exhibited across Poland throughout the 1920s and '30s. By the 1930s, his work was in collections in Poland, London, and Israel.

Shortly after the German invasion of Poland, in 1939, Natan Spigel, together with his family, was interned in the Radomsko ghetto. He continued to paint during this time. He was murdered in the Treblinka extermination camp in 1942.

Today Natan Spigel’s work can be seen in public collections in Tel Aviv, London, Lublin, and Ein Harod. Only about 20 of his paintings are definitely known to have survived.
