= National Center for Reason and Justice =

The National Center for Reason and Justice was a United States national non-profit organization disseminating information to the public about claims of injustice in the current criminal justice system and facilitating financial and legal assistance for people the organization considers likely to have been falsely accused or wrongfully convicted. The organization was dissolved on May 15, 2024.

According to the NCRJ, most of the individuals whose convictions were overturned have been convicted because of faulty eyewitness testimony, coerced confessions, or the acceptance of junk science in the courtroom.

Most NCRJ-sponsored cases involve accusations of sex offenses against children and adolescents, where the accusations are given wide media coverage.

NCRJ President Michael Snedeker is a criminal-defense lawyer who has successfully handled the appeals of ritual abuse cases in California. He is author of the California State Prisoners Handbook and co-author with Debbie Nathan of Satan's Silence: Ritual Abuse and the Making of a Modern American Witch Hunt.

Noted NCRJ Directors and advisers include: Elizabeth Loftus, Debbie Nathan and Judith Levine.

== See also ==
- Satanic ritual abuse
