= Positive deconstruction =

Methodology in Christian apologetics

Positive deconstruction, in relation to Christian apologetics, is a term first used by Nick Pollard in Evangelism Made Slightly Less Difficult (drawing on Dr. David Cook), to describe a methodology for engaging with worldviews in Christian apologetics. The process is one of deconstruction because it involves 'dismantling' the worldview in order to identify areas of conflict with a Christian worldview. It is positive because the intention is not to destroy a person's ideas and belief system, but to build on areas of agreement between the two worldviews in order to argue for the truth of the Christian worldview.

Pollard identifies four key aspects:

- Identify the worldview: What beliefs, values and attitudes are being communicated?
- Analyze the worldview, primarily in terms of the correspondence, coherence and pragmatic theories of truth
- Affirm the truth: what aspects of the worldview are in agreement with a Christian worldview?
- Deny the error: what aspects of the worldview are in conflict with a Christian worldview?

Tony Watkins develops this in relation to film in Focus: The Art and Soul of Cinema. He aims to make the positive deconstruction process more accessible, and accordingly re-labels the four aspects of the process (pp. 31–45):

- Analyze the worldview, in which he suggests a five-part framework for considering worldviews:
  - What is reality?
  - What does it mean to be human?
  - How do we know what the good is?
  - How do we know anything at all?
  - What is the fundamental problem confronting all human beings, and what is the solution?
- Evaluate the worldview (as with Pollard's second stage, this is terms of correspondence, coherence, pragmatism)
- Celebrate the good
- Challenge the bad

Communication Aspects to benefit Positive Deconstrusction

Communication is human interaction, the transfer of information, effect or influence, mutual understanding, community and culture (Craig, 2017). Without understanding the communication aspect of how we transfer information, we will never be able to clearly communicate or understand others and how they are communicating. When it comes to the art of communicating there is a term used called communication competence. We will never be able to reach the goal of coming to an understanding with worldviews and Christian worldview if communication competence is not being achieved.

Communication competence is when communication achieves two fundamental properties: effectiveness (meeting our goals in a conversation) and appropriateness (maintaining situational rules or expectations (Canary et.al). Competent communication includes a range of abilities, including empathy, interaction management, responsibility, and involvement (Aune, Levine, Park, Asada, Banas, 2005; Spitzberg & Cupach, 1989).

Interpersonal communication can be defined as the exchange of symbols, including verbal and nonverbal representations of ideas, emotions. objects or events, used at least in part in the joint pursuit of interpersonal goals (Canary et.al) Bergen (1985) identified symbols as "behaviors that are typically sent with an intent, used with regularity among members of a social community, and have consensually recognizable interpretations." The whole point of communicating to the degree in which to come to a sort of consensus the goal is to primarily communicate Christian worldview and understand and reason with the individual and their point of view without having to cause offense or frustration. Interpersonal goal is something one person wants to achieve that is linked to another person, thoughts, feelings or actions. The more specific the goal, the clearer it tends to become and the more motivated, in general, an individual will be to achieve it (Canary et.al)

Three types of interpersonal goals:

- Self presentation goals: by working to communicate an image of who we are, and how we want to be perceived.
- Relational goals: by working to develop, maintain, or neglect particular relationships.
- Instrumental goals: as we try to get other to do us a favor, or provide some kind of resource.

How interpersonal goals relate to Positive Deconstruction

Self-presentation: In the context of positive deconstruction, individuals may engage in self-presentation by expressing their evolving beliefs and spiritual journey authentically. This involves being honest and transparent about their questions, doubts, and struggles with traditional Christian teachings. Through self-presentation, individuals seek to present themselves genuinely, without fear of judgment or rejection, as they navigate their faith journey.

Instrumental: The instrumental goal involves achieving specific outcomes or objectives through communication. In the context of positive deconstruction within Christianity, individuals may have instrumental goals such as seeking clarity, understanding, and personal growth. They may use communication as a tool to deconstruct and reconstruct their beliefs, seeking to align their faith with their evolving understanding of theology, scripture, and spirituality.

Relational: The relational goal focuses on building and maintaining relationships through communication. In the context of positive deconstruction within Christianity, individuals may navigate relational dynamics with others who may hold different beliefs or perspectives. They may seek to foster understanding, empathy, and mutual respect in their relationships, even amidst theological differences. Additionally, individuals may seek out supportive communities or relationships that encourage open dialogue, acceptance, and growth.

Overall, the three interpersonal goals; self-presentation, instrumental, and relational, intersect with positive deconstruction within Christianity by guiding individuals in their communication and relationships as they explore and navigate their evolving faith journey. Through authentic self-expression, intentional communication, and relational engagement, individuals can foster a supportive environment for positive deconstruction, personal growth, and spiritual exploration within the Christian context.
