= Cornelia B. Wilbur =

American psychiatrist (1908–1992)

- West Virginia University Faculty, circa 1965
- Born: Cornelia Burwell Wilbur; August 26, 1908; Cleveland, Ohio
- Died: April 9, 1992 (aged 83); Fayette County, Kentucky
- Other name: Connie
- Education: University of Michigan
- Occupation: Psychiatrist

Cornelia Burwell Wilbur (August 26, 1908 – April 9, 1992) was an American psychiatrist. Her psychiatric treatment of a woman she diagnosed with multiple personalities was the basis for a book, written by Flora Rheta Schreiber, and two television films titled Sybil.

== Biography ==
=== Early life and education ===
Cornelia "Connie" Wilbur was born in Cleveland, Ohio, on August 26, 1908. While she was an infant, her family moved to a ranch in Montana. The family returned to Cleveland in 1918. She was educated in the public schools in Montana and Cleveland.

She attended William Smith College in Geneva, New York, before enrolling at the University of Michigan in Ann Arbor, Michigan. She received her bachelor's degree and master's degree from the University of Michigan. She then enrolled at the University of Michigan Medical School. While in medical school, she became the first female extern at Kalamazoo State Hospital, where she also successfully treated an agoraphobic girl diagnosed with hysteria. Wilbur graduated with an M.D. in 1939. She was one of eight women in her graduating class.

=== Academic career ===
Wilbur became a Diplomate of the American Board of Neurology and Psychiatry in both Neurology and Psychiatry in 1946 and received a certificate in psychoanalysis in 1951. She practiced psychiatry in Omaha, Nebraska; New York City; and Weston, West Virginia.

Wilbur is best known for her work with Shirley Ardell Mason, who was purported to have been severely abused as a child, and who developed 16 alternate personalities as a result. A book, written by Flora Rheta Schreiber, and a television film, both titled Sybil, were ostensibly non-fiction accounts of the psychiatric treatment received by Mason while in Wilbur's care. She diagnosed and treated Mason for dissociative identity disorder (then referred to as Multiple Personality Disorder) for 11 years, beginning in 1954.

Wilbur was a pioneer clinician, as well as an educator, researcher, and mentor for others in the field of psychiatry. She was among 7 psychoanalysts contributing to Irving Bieber's Homosexuality: A Psychoanalytic Study of Male Homosexuals (1962), an influential study of the development of male homosexuality.

Wilbur joined the University of Kentucky College of Medicine in 1967, earning an appointment as a professor of psychiatry.

Wilbur lectured around the world about child, spouse, and elder abuse and their repercussions, and advocated parenting education to prevent child abuse. She was also interested in increasing the admission rates of women to medical schools.

In the late 1970s, Wilbur consulted on the case of Billy Milligan, the first man to be acquitted of a crime in the United States by reason of insanity due to multiple personality disorder.

Wilbur was a Life Fellow of the American Medical Association, the American Psychiatric Association, and the American Academy of Psychoanalysis. She was honored by the University of Kentucky Medical College for her Outstanding Contribution to Medical Education. In 1987, she was honored for her Distinguished Achievements by the International Society for the Study of Multiple Personality and Dissociative Disorders. She published about 50 papers in peer-reviewed professional journals. She ended her career as Professor Emerita at the University of Kentucky Medical College.

=== Treatment of Shirley Mason and Sybil ===
Wilbur's diagnosis of Mason has been questioned, and both Flora Schreiber and she have been accused of inventing or exaggerating the multiple personality diagnosis and manipulating Mason for professional and financial gain. One examination of the case of "Sybil" is Debbie Nathan's book Sybil Exposed: The Extraordinary Story Behind the Famous Multiple Personality Case. Nathan presented evidence that Mason never displayed multiple personalities until she met Wilbur. The patient's symptoms emerged over the years from a mutually reinforced self-deception of both Mason and Wilbur. Nathan's research indicated that Wilbur and Schreiber fabricated aspects of the treatment narrative in Sybil to bolster their claims about Mason, even including Mason's father's claim that Mason's mother had been diagnosed with schizophrenia.

People related to Shirley Mason backed up Shirley's diagnosis. Some professionals on dissociative disorders, like Colin A. Ross, have questioned Nathan's thesis that the real diagnosis was not DID, but pernicious anemia, which doesn't cause the symptoms —and doesn't disappear during the nine-year period Shirley wasn't in therapy— that Nathan described. Ross acknowledges, however, that Wilbur's treatment "involved massive boundary violations of numerous types over many years".

== Death ==
Wilbur died at her home in April 1992, after having a stroke. In 1991, she had been diagnosed with Parkinson's disease.

== Appearances ==
Old records of Wilbur appear in the 2021 documentary Monsters Inside: The 24 Faces of Billy Milligan.
