= Sex Without Shame =

1978 child psychiatry book

Sex Without Shame: Encouraging the Child's Healthy Sexual Development
- Author: Alayne Yates
- Genre: Nonfiction
- Publisher: William Morrow and Company
- Publication date: January 1978
- Pages: 252
- ISBN: 978-0688033019

Sex Without Shame: Encouraging the Child's Healthy Sexual Development is a 1978 book by American child psychiatrist and University of Arizona professor Alayne Yates.
