= Michael S. McLean =

American film director

- Born: December 27, 1942 (age 82); Cambridge, Massachusetts, U.S.
- Occupation(s): Director, editor, producer
- Notable work: Freebie and the Bean, Stargate SG-1, Vega$
- Children: 2
- Awards: Emmy Award for Eleanor and Franklin: The White House Years

Michael S. McLean is an American retired film and television director, editor, and producer. He is perhaps best known for his work on Stargate SG-1, Freebie and the Bean, Vega$, and the Emmy Award-winning Eleanor and Franklin: The White House Years.
