= Chaike Belchatowska Spiegel =

Jewish anti-Nazi resistance fighter

Chaike B. Spiegel
- Born: November 11, 1920; Warsaw, Poland
- Died: March 26, 2002 (aged 81); Montreal, Canada
- Organization: Jewish Labor Bund Jewish Fighting Organization (known by the Polish acronym ZOB)
- Spouse: Boruch Yakir Spiegel

Chaike Belchatowska Spiegel (November 11, 1920 – March 26, 2002), also called Helen, was a Jewish resistance fighter and one of the last survivors in the 1943 Warsaw Ghetto Uprising against the Nazis.

== Early life ==
Spiegel was born in Warsaw, Poland, to a radical mother. She was a member of the Marxist socialist Jewish Labor Bund. After the 1939 invasion of Poland by Nazi Germany, Polish Jews were systematically deported.

== Warsaw Ghetto Uprising ==
She joined the Jewish Combat Organization (ZOB) in January 1943 after she escaped from the train that was taking her to Treblinka extermination camp in November 1942. On the first night of the Jewish Feast of Passover on April 19, 1943, under the command of Colonel Ferdinand von Sammern-Frankenegg, a Nazi force entered the Warsaw Ghetto to resume deportation, but they were repelled by ZOB and other resistance groups thereby suffering heavy losses. The Germans were taken by surprise as the fighters were poorly armed with only a handful of smuggled outdated weapons, improvised Molotov cocktails and little ammunition.

The Nazis retaliated under the command of General Jürgen Stroop after Colonel Sammern-Frankenegg was relieved of his command, but were once more blocked by the Jews after several days of rigorous fighting. The Germans then decided to change their approach and brought in flamethrowers to systematically burn down the ghetto. On May 8, they used poison gas and the ZOB headquarters fell.

An estimated 7,000 Jews were killed during the fighting and 30,000 were deported to death camps while 50 to 100 Jewish resistance fighters escaped to the woods outside of Warsaw.

Spiegel moved to Sweden after the Germans were driven from Poland by Soviet troops. She was married to Boruch Yakir Spiegel who was one of the Jewish resistance fighters that managed to escape from the ghetto to the forests outside Warsaw. They were refused American visas and resided in Sweden and Canada after the war.

Regarding the war experience, Spiegel was quoted as saying "Whenever we start a conversation — it can be about the weather — we always end up talking about the years over there. Without fail. I remember everything. It’s so in my mind, so vivid in my memory."

== Death ==
She died in Montreal, Canada on March 26, 2002. She had a son and a daughter.
