= Peter J. Swales =

Welsh historian (1948–2022)

Peter Joffre Swales (5 June 1948 – 15 April 2022) was a Welsh "guerilla historian of psychoanalysis and former assistant to the Rolling Stones". He called himself "the punk historian of psychoanalysis", and he is well known for his essays on Sigmund Freud. A 1998 article in The New York Times Magazine noted his "remarkable detective work over the last 25 years, revealing the true identities of several early patients of Freud's who had been known only by their pseudonyms." He is one of three men (the others are the late Freud Archives director Kurt R. Eissler and erstwhile Projects Director of the Freud Archives Jeffrey Masson) whose machinations are described in Janet Malcolm's 1984 book In the Freud Archives, which originated as two articles in The New Yorker magazine that provoked Masson to file an unsuccessful $10 million libel suit against the magazine and Malcolm.

In Malcolm's 1984 book, she described Swales as "one of the leading authorities—perhaps the leading authority—on the early life of Freud and on the early history of psychoanalysis". Peter L. Rudnytsky, editor of the History of Psychoanalysis series for Routledge publishers, wrote that he considers Swales "to have been the greatest Freud scholar who ever lived".

Swales "became notorious when, in 1981, he maintained that Freud had had a secret affair with his wife Martha’s younger sister Minna Bernays ... and had arranged for her to have an abortion after she became pregnant".

In 1989, Swales played a prominent role in revealing that in 1981, Freud biographer Peter Gay had presented a review of Freud's The Interpretation of Dreams in Harper's Magazine, which Gay had falsely claimed to have discovered in "an obscure Austrian medical journal" from July 1900, but, in fact, had written himself.

In 1995, Swales sent a petition, for which he had acquired nearly 50 signatories, to the Library of Congress expressing concern that its planned Freud exhibition was not sufficiently critical of Freud — that it did not "suitably portray the present status of knowledge and adequately reflect the full spectrum of informed opinion about the status of Freud's contribution to intellectual history." Following the petition, the Library postponed the exhibition, invited Freud critics to participate, and opened the exhibition in 1998.

In 1998, Swales discovered the true identity of the pseudonymous "Sybil", who was alleged to have had multiple personalities.

Swales died at his home near İzmir, Turkey on 15 April 2022, where he had lived since 2007. He had moved there from Mott Street in lower Manhattan, where he had lived for the previous 35 years. He died from "a short illness and infection." He is survived by his wife Julia and by his two sisters, Patricia Barker Swales and Freda Swales.

== Swales's publications ==
- Peter J. Swales, "Freud, Minna Bernays, and the Conquest of Rome: New Light on the Origins of Psychoanalysis," The New American Review (Spring/Summer 1982), pp. 1–23. National Library of Medicine
- Peter J. Swales, "A Fascination with Witches: Medieval tales of torture altered the course of psychoanalysis," The Sciences, vol. 22, no. 8 (November 1982), pp. 21–25.
- Peter J. Swales, "The Freud Archives," The New York Review of Books, October 24, 1985 (letter to the editor).
- Peter J. Swales, "Freud, His Teacher, and the Birth of Psychoanalysis," Freud: Appraisals and Reappraisals, Contributions to Freud Studies, Volume 1, edited by Paul Stepansky, Hillsdale, N.J.: The Analytic Press, 1986. ISBN 0-88163-038-1
- Peter J. Swales, "Freud, Katharina, and the First 'Wild Analysis,'" Freud: Appraisals and Reappraisals, Contributions to Freud Studies, Volume 3, edited by Paul Stepansky, Hillsdale, N.J.: The Analytic Press, 1988. ISBN 0-88163-074-8
- Peter J. Swales, "Freud's Master Hysteric," Unauthorized Freud: Doubters Confront a Legend, edited by Frederick C. Crews, New York: Viking Penguin, 1988. ISBN 0-670-87221-0
- Peter J. Swales, "Protecting Freud's Image From Sigmund," Los Angeles Times (May 8, 1988) (review of Gay, Peter, Freud: A Life for Our Time, New York: W. W. Norton, 1988).
- Peter J. Swales, "Freud, Cocaine, and Sexual Chemistry: The Role of Cocaine in Freud's Conception of the Libido," Sigmund Freud: Critical Assessments, London and New York: Routledge, Laurence Spurling, ed., vol. 1 (1989), pp. 273–301.
- Peter J. Swales, "Freud, Fliess, and Fratricide: The Role of Fliess in Freud's Conception of Paranoia," Sigmund Freud: Critical Assessments, London and New York: Routledge, Laurence Spurling, ed., vol. 1 (1989), pp. 302–330.
- Peter J. Swales, "Freud, Johann Weier, and the Status of Seduction: The Role of the Witch in the Conception of Fantasy," Sigmund Freud: Critical Assessments, London and New York: Routledge, Laurence Spurling, ed., vol. 1 (1989), pp. 331–358.
- Peter J. Swales, "Freud, Krafft-Ebing, and the Witches: The Role of Krafft-Ebing in Freud's Flight into Fantasy," Sigmund Freud: Critical Assessments, London and New York: Routledge, Laurence Spurling, ed., vol. 1 (1989), pp. 359–365.
- Peter J. Swales, "Reading Freud", The Times Literary Supplement, Issue 4557, August 3, 1990, p. 823 (letter to the editor).
- Peter J. Swales, "What Jung Didn't Say," Harvest: Journal for Jungian Studies, vol. 38 (1992), pp. 30–37.
- Peter J. Swales, "Once a cigar, always a cigar," Nature, vol. 378 (2 November 1995), pp. 107–108 (review of Webster, Richard, Why Freud Was Wrong: Sin, Science and Psychoanalysis, HarperCollins/Basic Books, 1995).
- Peter J. Swales, "Freud, Filthy Lucre, and Undue Influence," Review of Existential Psychology & Psychiatry, vol. XXIII, nos. 1, 2, & 3 (1997), pp. 115–141.
- Peter J. Swales, "Freud, Death and Sexual Pleasures: On the Psychical Mechanism of Dr. Sigm. Freud", Arc de Cercle, vol. 1, no. 1 (January 2003), pp. 5-74. National Library of Medicine
- Malcolm Macmillan and Peter J. Swales, "Observations from the Refuse-Heap: Freud, Michelangelo's Moses, and Psychoanalysis," American Imago, vol. 60, no. 1 (Spring 2003). JSTOR Project Muse

=== Foreign language articles ===
- Peter J. Swales, "Ce que Freud ne dit pas". Pp. 194-200 in La Sexualité: D'où vient l’Orient? Où va l'Occident?, edited by Armando Verdiglione. Paris: Pierre Belfond, 1984.
- Peter J. Swales, "Quel che Freud non disse", in La Sessualità: Da Dove Viene L'Oriente Dove Va L'Occidente. Spirali/Vel, 1985. Translation of "Ce que Freud ne dit pas".
- Peter J. Swales, "Brief Eines Landarztes". Werkblatt: Zeitschrift für Psychoanalyse und Gesellschaftskritik, Jg.4, No. 1/2 – 1987.
- Peter J. Swales, "Lettera aproposita: Processo alla Parola". Spirali, gennaio/febbraio 1987. X, 88/89: 67 – 1987.
- Peter J. Swales, "Freud e il medico di campagna," in La Cifra: pensiero, scrittura, proposte — Sessualità e intelligenza, I, Spirali/Vel, 1988, pp. 172-174.
- Peter J. Swales, "Freud e il gas esilarante. Freud e il medico di campagna. Johann Weyer". La Cifra: pensiero, scrittura, proposte. I: 168-177 – 1988.
- Peter J. Swales, "Anna O. in Ischl". Werkblatt: Zeitschrift für Psychoanalyse und Gesellschaftskritik. V, 1/2: 57-64 – 1988.
- Peter J. Swales, "Verdiglione, Strømme e la forza del destino". La Cifra: pensiero, scrittura, proposte. IV: 225-233 – 1990.
- Klaus Kamolz und Peter J. Swales, "Die verflixten Sieben Jahre: Marilyn Monroe, ihre Passion für Sigmund Freud und ihre Behandlung durch die Weiner Schule der Psychoanalyse". profil, No. 28, 6 July 1992.

=== Articles online at Histories of Psychoanalysis ===
The following otherwise unpublished articles and letters by Swales appear at the Histories of Psychoanalysis website:

- Freud, the 'Love-Life', and the Low-Life; Toward a Daseins-Gestalt of Dr.Sigm.Freud (c.2007)
- Burroughs in the bewilderness: The haunted mind and psychoanalyses of William S. Burroughs (1993–1994)
- Ecce Sigi: What Freud didn't say (2003)
- Freud, Breuer, & the blessed virgin (1986)
- Freud, filthy lucre, and undue influence (1997)
- Freud, Prof. Diogenes Teufelsdröckh, and the Garden of Eden (1988)
- In statu nascendi: Freud, Minna Bernays, and the creation of Herr Aliquis (1998)
- Psychoanalysis, arrivisme, & the new world (2008/2012)
- Verdiglione, Strømme, e la Forza del Destino: An exemplary and a cautionary tale (1990)
- Viper in the Grass, Vultures in the Sky: Dr. Kurt R. Eissler, a Dying Patient, & the Manischewitz Dynasty (2010/2012)
- What's the problem? — A quiz (2000)
