= Otto Schneid =

Austrian-Israeli art historian (1900–1974)

Otto Schneid (Hebrew: אוטו שנייד; also known as Naftali Schneid; 30 January 1900 – 12 May 1974) was an Austrian-Israeli art historian, writer and artist. He was based in Europe and later in Israel and North America.

== Biography ==
Schneid was born on 30 January 1900 in Jablunkov, Austria-Hungary. He received his PhD from the University of Vienna. He was among the early researchers studying the field of Jewish art in Europe during the interwar period, and had completed a manuscript titled Der Jude und die Kunst ("The Jew in the Arts"). Schneid later worked as a professor in Israel and then later in North America. His archives are maintained by the National Library of Israel, and the University of Toronto.

Otto Schneid was married to the writer Miriam Schneid (1923–2012). He died on 12 May 1974 in Toronto, Canada.

== Select publications ==
- Schneid, O. (1934). Das chinesische Vordergrundbild: Tier- und Pflanzenmalerei Ostasiens. Vienna: Rohrer.
- Schneid, O. (1939). "Yiddishe Kunst in Poyln", Yidisher gezelshaftlekher lexikon Vol. 1. pp. 334–358.
- Schneid, O. (1946). Tziyurei bet-ha-knesset b'dura-iropas: Yetzirah yehudit atika u'mekomah b'toldot ha-umnot [Paintings of the synagogue in Dora-Europos: An ancient Jewish work and its place in the history of art]. Tel Aviv: Gazit.
- Schneid, O. (1947). Ha-tanakh b'tmunot Rembrandt [The Hebrew Bible in the paintings of Rembrandt]. Tel Aviv: Yavne.
- Schneid, O. (1947). Omanut Yaṿan ha-ḳlasit. Amud.
- Schneid, O. (1970). The Man-Made Hell: A Search for Rescue. Toronto: Source Books.
- Schneid, O. (1971). The Book of Ruth with twelve Facsimile Plates after Original Drawings. Toronto: Source Books.
- Schneid, O. (1976). Birkat tehom [Blessing of the depths]. Tel Aviv: Traklin.
