= Sybil (Schreiber book) =

1973 book by Flora Rheta Schreiber

- Cover of the first edition
- Author: Flora Rheta Schreiber
- Translator: Taunusplatz
- Language: English
- Publisher: Henry Regnery Company
- Publication date: 1973
- Publication place: United States
- Media type: Print (hardcover and paperback)
- Pages: 359
- ISBN: 0-8092-0001-5
- OCLC: 57119767

Sybil is a 1973 book by Flora Rheta Schreiber about the treatment of Sybil Dorsett (a pseudonym for Shirley Ardell Mason) for dissociative identity disorder (then referred to as multiple personality disorder) by her psychoanalyst, Cornelia B. Wilbur.

It was made into two television movies of the same name, once in 1976 and again in 2007.

The book and case were subject to harsh criticism in Debbie Nathan's 2011 book, Sybil Exposed.

== Summary ==
Mason is given the pseudonym "Sybil" by her therapist to protect her privacy. In 1998, Sigmund Freud historian Peter J. Swales discovered Sybil's true identity. Originally in treatment for social anxiety and memory loss, after extended therapy involving amobarbital and hypnosis interviews, Sybil manifests sixteen personalities. Wilbur encouraged Sybil's various selves to communicate and reveal information about her life. Wilbur writes that Sybil's multiple personality disorder was a result of the severe physical and sexual abuse she allegedly suffered at the hands of her mother, Hattie.

=== Described personalities ===
The book begins with a list of Sybil's alters, together with the year in which each appeared to have dissociated from the central personality. The names of these selves were also changed to ensure privacy.

- Sybil Isabel Dorsett (1923), the main personality
- Victoria Antoinette Scharleau (1926), nicknamed Vicky, self-assured and sophisticated young French girl
- Peggy Lou Baldwin (1926), assertive, enthusiastic, and often angry
- Peggy Ann Baldwin (1926), a counterpart of Peggy Lou but more fearful than angry
- Mary Lucinda Saunders Dorsett (1933), a thoughtful, contemplative, and maternal homebody
- Marcia Lynn Dorsett (1927), an extremely emotional writer and painter
- Vanessa Gail Dorsett (1935), intensely dramatic, fun-loving, and a talented musician
- Mike Dorsett (1928), one of Sybil's two male selves, a builder and a carpenter
- Sid Dorsett (1928), the second of Sybil's two male selves, a carpenter and a general handyman. Sid took his name from Sybil's initials (Sybil Isabelle Dorsett)
- Nancy Lou Ann Baldwin (date undetermined), interested in politics as the fulfillment of Biblical prophecy and intensely afraid of Roman Catholics
- Sybil Ann Dorsett (1928), listless to the point of neurasthenia
- Ruthie Dorsett (date undetermined), a baby and one of the less developed selves
- Clara Dorsett (date undetermined), intensely religious and highly critical of Sybil
- Helen Dorsett (1929), intensely afraid but determined to achieve fulfillment
- Marjorie Dorsett (1928), serene, vivacious, and quick to laugh
- The Blonde (1946), a nameless perpetual teenager with an optimistic outlook

The book's narrative describes Sybil's selves gradually becoming co-conscious, able to communicate and share responsibilities, and having musical compositions and art published under their various names. Wilbur attempts to integrate Sybil's various selves, first convincing them via hypnosis that they are all the same age, then encouraging them to merge. At the book's end, a new, optimistic self (called "The Blonde") emerges, preceding Sybil's final integration into a single, whole individual with full knowledge of her past and present life.

== Controversy ==
The book had an initial print run of 400,000. The book is believed by Mark Pendergrast and Joan Acocella to have established the template for the later upsurge in the diagnoses of dissociative identity disorders.

Audiotapes of recorded conversations between Schreiber and Wilbur were examined by Herbert Spiegel and later by academic Robert W. Rieber of John Jay College of Criminal Justice. Both concluded that Wilbur suggested multiple personalities to her client, whom they saw as a simple "hysteric". Their purported proof of this claim is a session tape in which Wilbur is heard describing to Mason the personalities she has already seen Mason exhibit. Spiegel and Rieber also claim that Wilbur and Schreiber fabricated most of the book. Many details of the real case were changed or removed to protect Mason's privacy.

Critics of Spiegel and Rieber's "revelation" ask why they waited until after Schreiber, Wilbur, and Mason were all dead before revealing the tapes, which Spiegel supposedly had in his possession all along. A review of Rieber's book Bifurcation of the Self by Mark Lawrence states that Rieber repeatedly distorted the evidence and left out a number of important facts about Mason's case, in order to advance his case against the validity of the diagnosis.

Patrick Suraci, author of SYBIL in her own words, personally acquainted with Shirley Mason and still in touch with members of her family, criticizes Spiegel for what he terms unethical behavior in withholding the tapes. Spiegel also claimed to have made films of himself hypnotizing Mason, supposedly proving that Wilbur had "implanted false memories" in her mind, but when Suraci asked to see the films, Spiegel said he had lost them.

Wilbur's psychiatric files were destroyed upon her death.

In 2011, journalist Debbie Nathan published a detailed exposé, Sybil Exposed, in which she states that Wilbur, Mason and Schreiber knowingly perpetrated a fraud in order to create a "Sybil, Inc." business, selling T-shirts, stickers, board games and other paraphernalia. Much of Nathan's book repeats material already covered in the original Sybil, including a 1958 letter in which Mason spoke about making up the "alters" for attention and excitement. In Sybil, this letter was interpreted as an attempt to put difficult, painful therapy on hold. Nathan claims Schreiber became aware of Mason and her alleged past, writing Sybil based on stories coaxed from her during therapy, and that this case created an "industry" of repressed memory.

In 2013, artist-journalist Nancy Preston published After Sybil, a personal memoir which includes facsimile reproductions of Mason's personal letters to her, along with color plates of her paintings. According to Preston, Mason taught art at Ohio's Rio Grande College, where Preston was a student. The two became close friends and corresponded until a few days before Mason's death. In the letters, Mason confirmed that she had had multiple personalities.

The 1976 film adaptation of Sybil inspired psychiatrist Lawrence Pazder to think that his patient, and future wife, Michelle Smith was “just like” Sybil. This became the basis for the later-discredited book Michelle Remembers (1980), which helped trigger the global Satanic panic.

== Film adaptations ==
There have been two film adaptations, both made for television:

- Sybil (1976 film), an NBC TV-movie starring Sally Field.
- Sybil (2007 film), a CBS TV-movie starring Tammy Blanchard.

== In computer security ==
In computer security, a Sybil attack is one wherein a reputation system is subverted by creating multiple identities.

== See also ==
- Sybil attack
- Chris Costner Sizemore
- Misery literature
- Fake memoir
- False memories
