= Perry Greeley Holden =

American educator (1865–1959)

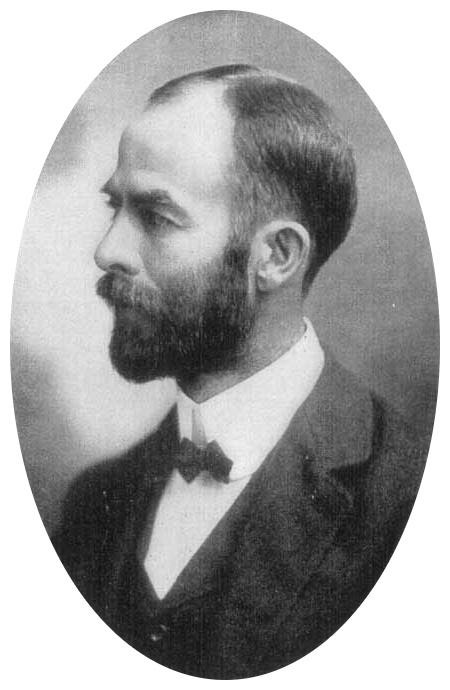
- Holden, c. 1916
- Born: October 13, 1865; Dodge Center, Minnesota, U.S.
- Died: October 8, 1959 (aged 93)
- Education: Michigan Agricultural College; Michigan State University (MS)
- Spouse: Carrie Amalia Burnett (m. 1892)
- Children: 4

Perry Greeley Holden (October 13, 1865 – October 8, 1959) was the first professor of agronomy in the United States.

== Biography ==
Holden was born in Dodge Center, Minnesota, to Dennison Franklin Holden and Mary Helen Wilson. He graduated from Michigan Agricultural College (now Michigan State University) in 1889 and taught at M. A. C. from 1889 to 1893. On November 11, 1892, he married Carrie Amalia Burnett (b. April 7, 1864). They had four children; one of them died as an infant. He studied at the Michigan State University where he was awarded an M.S. in 1895.

== Career ==
Subsequently, Holden went to the University of Illinois at Urbana-Champaign, where he became assistant professor for soil physics and the first professor of agronomy of the U.S. from 1896 until 1900. For the next two years, he served as a manager at the Funk Brothers Seed Company, promoting the improvement, selection and better management of corn seeds.

In 1902, Holden joined the Iowa State University, first as vice dean of agriculture and then, as of 1906, as head of the ISU Extension Service. Through his various outreach programs to promote the better selection and management of corn seeds he soon became known as the "corn evangelist". In 1912, he ran for governor of Iowa in the Republican primary.

After his defeat, Holden moved to Michigan again where he became director of International Harvester's Agricultural Extension department. He was especially interested in the boll weevil infestation in the South and in encouraging farmers to diversify to try to prevent such disasters. He retired in 1932 and helped his wife with her egg business on their Michigan farm.

== Death ==
Holden died on October 8, 1959. Personal and business papers were donated to the Michigan State College Library and are held in the Michigan State University's Archives and Historical Collections Department.
