= David Spiegel =

American psychiatrist

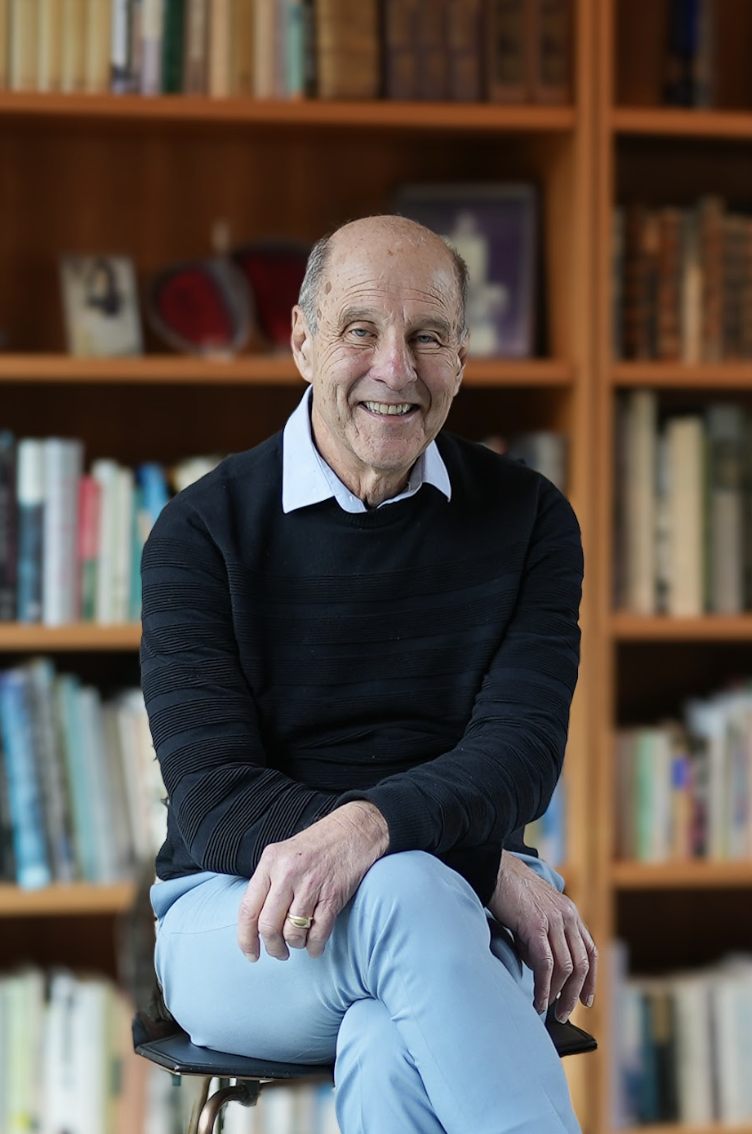
- Education: Yale University (BA); Harvard University (MD)
- Occupation: Psychiatrist
- Scientific career
- Workplaces: Stanford University School of Medicine

David Spiegel is an American psychiatrist and the Wilson Professor and Associate Chair of Psychiatry at Stanford University School of Medicine, where he is known for his research into psycho-oncology; the neurobiology of therapeutic hypnosis, and the role of the mind-brain-body connection in cancer outcomes and management among other topics. He directs the Stanford Center on Stress and Health and is a recognized authority on hypnosis's clinical utility and neuroscience.

== Education ==
Spiegel received his B.A. in philosophy from Yale College in 1967 and his M.D. from Harvard Medical School in 1971. Following his undergraduate medical training, Spiegel completed his psychiatry residency at Massachusetts Mental Health Center and Cambridge Health Alliance in 1974 in addition to a fellowship in community psychiatry the same year. Spiegel has been board-certified in psychiatry by the American Board of Psychiatry and Neurology since 1976.

== Research ==
Spiegel is author of more than 480 journal articles, 170 book chapters. He has published thirteen books.
