= Dodge Center Airport =

Dodge Center Municipal Airport
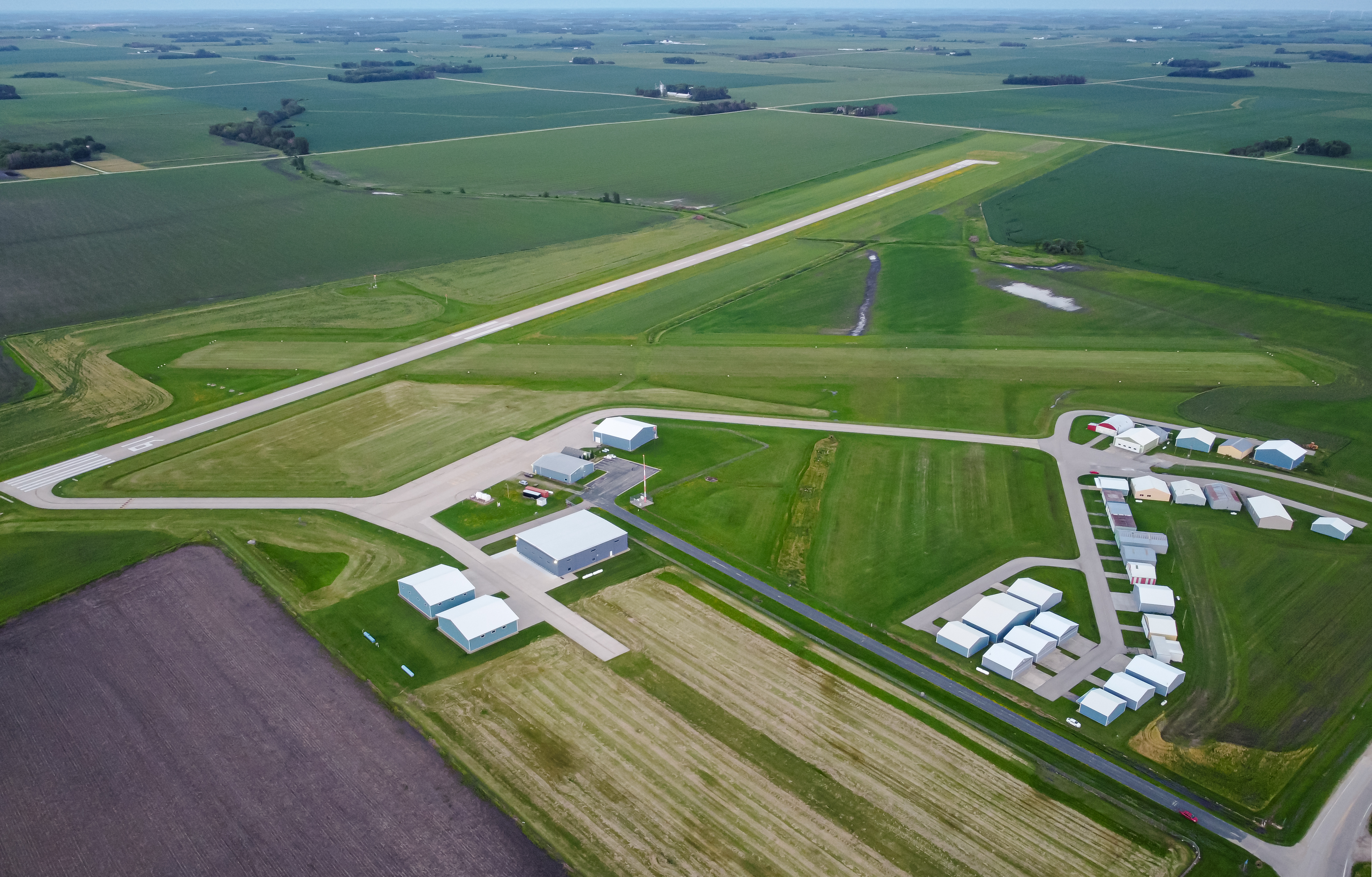
- IATA: -; ICAO: KTOB; FAA LID: TOB

Summary
- Airport type: Public
- Owner: City of Dodge Center
- Location: Dodge Center, Minnesota
- Elevation AMSL: 1,305 ft / 398 m
- Coordinates: 44°1′5″N 92°50′4″W

Map
- Location of airport in Minnesota/United States TOB (the United States)

Runways
Direction	Length		Surface
Direction	ft	m	Surface
16/34	4,500	1,372	Asphalt
4/22	2,390	728	Turf

Dodge Center Municipal Airport (IATA: ---, ICAO: KTOB, FAA LID: TOB) is a public airport located one mile from the central business district of Dodge Center a city in Dodge County, Minnesota, United States. The airport is publicly owned by the city of Dodge Center.

== See also ==
- List of airports in Minnesota
