= Spiegle =

Spiegle is a given name and surname. Notable people with the name include:

- Spiegle Willcox (1903–1999), American jazz trombonist
- Dan Spiegle (1920–2017), American comic book and cartoon artist
- Garry Spiegle, role-playing game designer

== See also ==
- Spiegel (disambiguation)
