= Debbie Nathan =

American journalist (born 1950)

- Born: 1950 (age 75–76); Houston, Texas, U.S.
- Education: Shimer College; Temple University (BA); University of Texas at El Paso
- Occupations: Journalist; writer
- Spouse: Morton Naess
- Children: 2
- Website: www.debbienathan.com

Debbie Nathan (born 1950) is an American feminist journalist and writer, with a focus on cultural and criminal justice issues concerning abuse of children, particularly accusations of satanic ritual abuse in schools and child care institutions. She also writes about immigration, focusing on women and on dynamics between immigration and sexuality. Nathan's writing has won a number of awards. She appears in the 2003 Oscar-nominated film Capturing the Friedmans. She has been affiliated with the National Center for Reason and Justice, which, among other things, provides support to persons who may have been wrongly accused of sexual abuse.

== Biography ==
Nathan was born in 1950 into a Jewish family in Houston, Texas. She received her BA from Temple University in 1972, after first attending Shimer College, a very small college in Great Books, Illinois. She went on to receive a master's degree in linguistics from the University of Texas El Paso.

Nathan taught English as a second language at Brooklyn College, then moved to Chicago in 1980, where she began her journalism career at the Chicago Reader. She returned to El Paso in 1984 to work for the El Paso Times, then became a freelance journalist. In 1998, she took a job writing for the San Antonio Current, then moved to New York City in 2000. Nathan is a board member for the National Center for Reason and Justice, non-profit organization that aids people likely to have been falsely accused and/or convicted of harming children.

=== Personal life ===
Nathan is married to Morten Naess, a family physician. The couple have two grown children.

== Works ==
=== Satan's Silence ===
Satan's Silence, a 1995 work which Nathan co-authored with Michael Snedeker, examined and aimed to debunk the wave of satanic ritual abuse allegations that took place beginning in the 1980s. Victor Navasky described the book as the "definitive study" of the subject.

Paul Okami's review of the book in The Journal of Sex Research noted that the book "is not . . . a scientific work", and he had some criticisms of its organization and what Okami described as misapplication of certain social-science concepts and an over-reliance in some parts of the book on feminist and leftist economic theory. Nevertheless, Okami judged the book to be "essential reading . . . for its devastating journalistic portrait" and "for its more general analysis of proximate mechanisms by which our society can become vulnerable to patent collective madness."

In addition to the book, Nathan published criticism of Janet Reno's Country Walk case prosecution.

=== Pornography ===
Pornography, published in 2007, is written as a concise "guidebook" on the subject of pornography. Greg Bak, a Canadian reviewer, described the writing as "frank and cool." He also made note of Nathan's assertion that no connection has been established between the use of pornography and criminal behavior, as well as her focus on the "connection between porn and shame" to define pornography.

=== Sybil Exposed ===
Nathan's 2011 book, Sybil Exposed, takes on the case of the famous psychiatric patient known as "Sybil", whose supposed dissociative identity disorder was the subject of a 1973 best-selling book and two motion pictures. Among other things, Nathan discovered that Sybil's psychiatrist was aware of (but apparently ignored) the fact that she had pernicious anemia, the symptoms of which would include most of the patient's complaints. Nathan's book received a starred review in Publishers Weekly, which called it a "startling exposé". Carol Tavris, reviewing the book for The Wall Street Journal, commented that "Nathan's indefatigable detective work in Sybil Exposed has produced a major contribution to the history of psychiatric fads and the social manufacture of mental disorders. This is the book that should be a made-for-TV movie."

== Bibliography ==
- Nathan, Debbie (1991). Women and other aliens: essays from the U. S.-Mexico border. El Paso, Tex: Cinco Puntos Press. ISBN 0-938317-08-3.
- Snedeker, Michael R.; Nathan, Debbie (1995). Satan's silence: ritual abuse and the making of a modern American witch hunt. New York: Basic Books. ISBN 0-465-07181-3.
- Nathan, Debbie (2007). Pornography (Groundwork Guides). Toronto: Groundwood Books. ISBN 978-0-88899-766-1.
- Nathan, Debbie (2011). Sybil Exposed. New York: Free Press. pp. 288. ISBN 978-1439168271.

Translations

- 1997: With Willivaldo Delgadillo: The Moon Will Forever Be a Distant Love by Luis Humberto Crosthwaite's novel: La luna siempre será un dificíl amor. Cinco Puntos Press, El Paso, TX, ISBN 0-938317318.
