= Spiegelman =

Spi(e)gelman(n) is a surname. Notable people with the surname include:

- Art Spiegelman (born 1948), American comics artist
- Bruce M. Spiegelman
- Donna Spiegelman
- James Spigelman (born 1946), Chief Justice of New South Wales
- Jeffrey Spiegelman, American politician
- Joel Spiegelman (1933–2023), American composer
- Mortimer Spiegelman (1901–1969), American statistician
- Nadja Spiegelman (born 1987), American writer
- Peter Spiegelman
- Sol Spiegelman (1914–1983), American microbiologist
- Vladek Spiegelman, father of Art Spiegelman and subject of his graphic novel Maus
