= Flora Rheta Schreiber =

American journalist

Flora Rheta Schreiber (April 24, 1918 – November 3, 1988) was an American journalist and the author of the 1973 bestseller Sybil. For many years, she was also an English instructor at John Jay College of Criminal Justice.

Her bestselling book, Sybil (1973), tells the story of a woman (identified years later as Shirley Ardell Mason) who had a dissociative identity disorder and allegedly 16 different personalities. The name Sybil Isabel Dorsett was used to cover Mason's identity, as she insisted on the protection of her privacy. Schreiber later wrote The Shoemaker, a book documenting the true story of Joseph Kallinger, a serial killer who was diagnosed with paranoid schizophrenia.

Schreiber's papers are housed in the Special Collections unit at Lloyd Sealy Library of John Jay College. The collection is a comprehensive documentation of her life and career.

== Selected bibliography ==
- 1954. William Schuman, coauthored with Vincent Persichetti. New York: G. Schirmer.
- 1956. Your Child's Speech: A Practical Guide for Parents for the First Five Years. New York: G. P. Putnam's Sons.
- 1973. Sybil. Chicago: Regnery.
- 1983. The Shoemaker: The Anatomy of a Psychotic. New York: Simon & Schuster.
