= Elisabeth Geleerd =

Dutch-American psychoanalyst (1909–1969)

- Geleerd in 1950
- Born: Elisabeth Rozetta Geleerd; March 20, 1909; Rotterdam, Netherlands
- Died: May 25, 1969 (aged 60); New York City, US
- Occupation: Psychoanalyst
- Spouse: Rudolph Loewenstein (m. 1946)

Elisabeth Rozetta Geleerd Loewenstein (March 20, 1909 – May 25, 1969) was a Dutch-American psychoanalyst. Born to an upper-middle-class family in Rotterdam, Geleerd studied psychoanalysis in Vienna, then London, under Anna Freud. Building a career in the United States, she became one of the nation's major practitioners in child and adolescent psychoanalysis throughout the mid-20th century. Geleerd specialized in the psychoanalysis of psychosis, including schizophrenia, and was an influential writer on psychoanalysis in childhood schizophrenia. She was one of the first writers to consider the concept of borderline personality disorder in childhood.

Geleerd was married to fellow psychoanalyst Rudolph Loewenstein from 1946 until her death; they had one child. She developed a reputation as a particularly skilled and empathetic clinician, described as having a "sensitive, searching, and romantic" temperament; she was also regarded as an independent thinker who would present her ideas forcefully even when their topics were sensitive enough for other psychoanalysts to avoid. Living with chronic illness for much of her adult life, Geleerd died at the age of 60 in New York in 1969.

== Early life ==
Elisabeth Rozetta Geleerd was born on March 20, 1909, in Rotterdam in an ethnically Jewish atheist family as the eldest of three children to Moses, a ship chandler, and Bertha (née Haas). Her father was a wealthy entrepreneur, and Geleerd grew up in an upper-middle-class background. Throughout Geleerd's childhood, her mother Bertha was chronically ill with tuberculosis and died from the disease when Geleerd was nine or ten; she and her brothers Yap and Benedictus were then placed in the custody of their aunt. This was a negative experience for her, and she returned to her father's house in early adolescence. Her father was distant and frequently engrossed in his work, although he supported his daughter's later ambitions to become a physician.

Several years after her mother's death, Geleerd's brother Yap also died of tuberculosis. These experiences have been credited as an inspiration for her to study medicine at the University of Leyden; she graduated with her MD in 1936. She then went to Vienna to study psychoanalysis under Anna Freud. Geleerd's studies at the Vienna Psychoanalytic Institute were deemed by her friend Helen Tartakoff as "a revolt from tradition even in the 1930s". Her studies were disrupted in 1938 by the rising Nazi presence in Austria, and she moved to London to complete her training. Following emigration, she worked with other psychoanalysts such as Ruth Mack Brunswick to assist others fleeing Vienna.

At the same time, her father and surviving brother moved to the South of France and to Switzerland respectively to flee increasing Nazi presence in the Netherlands, severing her remaining ties to her home country. Geleerd had a complex relationship with the Netherlands, finding it culturally stifling and feeling a stranger in her own home.

== Establishment of career ==
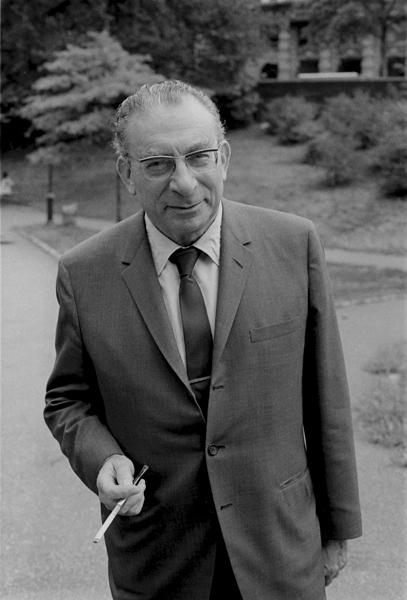
Rudolph Loewenstein

Geleerd continued her studies under Anna Freud in London, becoming one of her more prominent students; Geleerd was recognized for her independent thought and interpersonal style, "forcefully and capably" presenting her ideas even if the topics were deemed too sensitive or awkward to discuss by her peers. Her research would later be cited by Anna Freud in some of Freud's most significant publications throughout the 1950s and 1960s. During her time in London, Geleerd acted as a psychiatrist at the Maudsley Hospital in Denmark Hill and worked with French war refugees at the Tavistock Clinic in Swiss Cottage.

In 1940, Geleerd moved to the United States, a move encouraged by friends already resident in the country. She first settled in Topeka, Kansas, where she worked at Karl Menninger's Clinic throughout the first half of the 1940s. During this period, she worked in outreach to encourage parents to explain World War II to their children rather than hide its existence and consequences from them, based on her experiences treating displaced children in London. In 1946, Geleerd relocated to New York City and married fellow psychoanalyst Rudolph Loewenstein; they had one son, the psychiatrist Richard Loewenstein.

Throughout this period, Geleerd balanced family and work while affected by chronic illness. She was appointed a training analyst at the New York Psychoanalytic Institute in 1947, playing a pivotal role in the development of the institute's child and adolescent psychoanalytic programs; in 1955, she became a member of the Institute's Educational Committee. In the late 1940s or early 1950s, she spent six months at Mount Sinai Hospital helping to establish their child psychiatry department. Geleerd felt out of place at Mount Sinai and left the role earlier than expected. Her contemporaries in the field of child psychoanalysis also criticized the department, finding it of poor quality compared to the hospital's work in adult mental health.

== Major contributions to child psychoanalysis ==
Geleerd specialized in child and adolescent psychoanalysis. Due to her role with the New York Psychoanalytic Institute, she was one of the more influential psychoanalysts in the American practice of the discipline throughout the mid-20th century. She took particular interest in the psychoanalysis of childhood schizophrenia, at the time a popular diagnosis; much of what was deemed childhood schizophrenia in Geleerd's day is now classified as autism spectrum disorders. In 1946, Geleerd published a paper on children with behavioral issues, who she considered to be likely to develop schizophrenia, saying that the behavioral issues were themselves signs of psychosis. She argued that the use of psychoanalysis would potentially help this population, saying that it "may have favorably influenced the course" for those who received it.

Geleerd was one of the first psychoanalysts to consider the possibility of borderline personality disorder in children. Writing in 1958, she expanded on Margaret Mahler's 1949 description of a three-pronged portrait of autistic, psychotic, and "third group" children, and cross-referenced the third group with borderline personality disorder as experienced in adulthood. Her research was expanded on in the 1960s by Sara Kut Rosenfeld, a member of the first cohort of students of the Anna Freud Centre, and in the 1970s by Fred Pine, director of child psychiatry at the Jacobi Medical Center and later professor of psychiatry at the Albert Einstein College of Medicine.

Geleerd was a member of the "Freudian" or "classical" school of child psychoanalysis and a critic of the "Kleinian" school helmed by Melanie Klein; she accepted some Kleinian contributions, such as a focus on the importance of the first year of life for psychological development, but disagreed with most. Geleerd was most sympathetic to Kleinianism regarding psychosis. She was particularly critical of the permissive Kleinian position of granting children "all possible freedom of observation", believing much stricter therapeutic methods were needed for treatment. In 1968, Geleerd edited The Child Analyst at Work, a collection of case reports intended to provide a portrait of Freudian child psychoanalytic techniques; The Child Analyst at Work was produced as a response to books explicating the Kleinian therapeutic process in the absence of any Freudian counterparts. Various reviews described the book as "an excellent portrait of classical child analysis", but lacking focus due to its status as a compilation of pre-existing papers; as a "lucid introduction" to the subject, but slightly too complex for a fully unacquainted audience; and as "admirably" defending itself against contemporary critiques of psychoanalysis as a field.

Through her clinical work, Geleerd cultivated a reputation as a skilled and empathetic psychoanalyst. Tartakoff described her as having "an unusual sensitivity and empathy for the young", while historian Nellie L. Thompson described her as having a "sensitive, searching, and romantic" temperament matching her "neoclassical and delicate" appearance. Geleerd's clinical focus was on severe psychological disturbance and psychosis, seeking therapeutic solutions to mental health issues more complex than the neuroses. Schizophrenia was a particular focus of her career and the subject of many of her written works.

== Later life and death ==
In the 1960s, Geleerd came to focus on the adaptive aspects of ego defenses such as denial and regression, including the roles of those defenses in normal adolescence. She was particularly interested in the potential importance of regression to normal adolescent development, an idea also proposed by Jean Piaget. At the time of her death, she was working on a volume on adolescent psychoanalysis and development.

Geleerd died in New York City on May 25, 1969, at the age of 60, less than a month after presenting a panel at the 56th Annual Meeting of the American Psychoanalytic Association. She predeceased her husband, who died in 1976, and her teacher Anna Freud.

== Selected works ==
- The Child Analyst at Work. New York: International Universities Press, 1967.
- "Child Analysis: Research, Treatment and Prophylaxis" (1964), Journal of the American Psychoanalytic Association, vol. 12, no. 1, pp. 242–258.
- "Some Aspects of Ego Vicissitudes in Adolescence" (1961), Journal of the American Psychoanalytic Association, vol. 9, no. 1, pp. 394–405.
- "Borderline States in Childhood and Adolescence" (1958), The Psychoanalytic Study of the Child, vol. 13, no. 1, pp. 279–295.
- "The Psychoanalysis of a Psychotic Child" (1949), The Psychoanalytic Study of the Child, vol. 3, no. 4, pp. 311–332.
- "A Contribution to the Problem of Psychoses in Childhood" (1946), The Psychoanalytic Study of the Child, vol. 2, no. 1, pp. 271–291.
