= Ruth Selke Eissler =

American psychoanalyst

Ruth Selke Eissler (February 21, 1906 – October 7, 1989) was an American physician and psychoanalyst.

== Life ==
Ruth Selke was born into a Jewish family in Odesa, then part of the Russian Empire, now in Ukraine. Her father, Ludwig Selke, managed a bank and later worked as a grain export trader. Her mother, Jenny Lewin, was born on May 17, 1877, in Warsaw. In addition to Ruth, the couple had four other children: Eugen, Rudya, Eva and Angela. The family moved several times in her youth to Hamburg and Danzig.

Ruth Selke completed her Abitur in 1925 and then graduated from medical school at the University of Freiburg, Germany in 1930. She completed her residency in Heidelberg and earned her Doctor of Medicine degree from the University of Heidelberg in1932. She then worked in the Psychiatric Department of the Bürger Hospital in Stuttgart. Her dissertation was titled, Medical Histories of Six Cases: The Contribution of Social Hygiene to the Question of Alcoholism and Tuberculosis.

When Hitler came to power in 1933 in Germany, she went into self-exile in Vienna and worked at the psychiatric hospital in Rosenhügel. There, she trained in psychoanalysis and was admitted as a member of the Vienna Psychoanalytic Society in 1937.

She began her personal analysis with Theodor Reik but continued with Netherlands. She continued her analysis with Richard Sterba. Notably, she later became the analyst of renowned psychoanalyst Heinz Kohut.

In Vienna, she met the psychiatrist and psychoanalyst Kurt Robert Eissler (1908–1999), co-founder of the Sigmund Freud Archives, and they married in 1936. After the Anschluss in March 12, 1938, Austria was annexed to Germany by Hitler, the couple moved to the United States arriving in Chicago, where she joined the Chicago Psychoanalytic Society while working as a child psychiatrist at the Michael Reese Hospital. During World War II, she served as a consulting physician in a rehabilitation program in Chicago and in 1949 published a paper about her work.

In 1948, Ruth and her husband moved to New York City, where she became a member and educator of the New York Psychoanalytic Society. Eissler later served as secretary and vice-president of the International Psychoanalytic Association.

From 1950 to 1985, she was one of four editors of The Psychoanalytic Study of the Child, founded in 1945 by Anna Freud, Heinz Hartmann and Ernst Kris, and published annually. There, she served as editor for 35 volumes in addition to publishing an anthology titled Physical Illness and Handicap in Childhood alongside Anna Freud, Marianne Kris, and Albert J. Solnit.

Ruth Eissler's other writings included poetry, several short stories and a novel (that was never published). In honor of her 70th birthday, a collection of her German-language poetry was published In 1976 by Abaris Books in New York.

Ruth Eissler died in New York City on October 7, 1989, survived by her husband.

== The Selke-Eissler family collection ==
The Leo Baeck Institute in Manhattan holds the Selke-Eissler Family Collection, which contains archival material from family members under the identifier: AR 10926 / MF 875. Archives are from 1914 through the 1940s and mention the following individuals and families: Selke family, Eissler family, Eugen Selke, Ruth Selke Eissler and Jenny Selke. The archives contain items written in German, English and Russian.

== Selected works ==
- Selke, Ruth. "Sechs Lebensläufe als sozialhygienischer Beitrag zur Frage Alkoholismus und Tuberkulose." Klinische Wochenschrift 11.19 (1932): 805–807.
- Eissler-Selke, Ruth, et al. eds. (1945-1985) Psychoanalytic Study of the Child. United States, Random House Publishing Group.
- Eissler-Selke, Ruth. (1946). About the historical truth in a case of delusion. Psychoanalytic Review, 33, 442–459.
- Eissler-Selke, Ruth. (1949). Observations in a home for delinquent girls. Psychoanalytic Study of the Child, 3-4, 449–460.
- Eissler-Selke, Ruth, Blitzstein, N. Lionel, and Eissler, Kurt R. (1950). Emergence of hidden ego tendencies during dream analysis. International Journal of Psycho-Analysis, 31, 12–17.
- Freud, Anna, and Ruth Selke Eissler. (1965). The psychoanalytic study of the child. Vol. 3. Yale University Press.
- Eissler-Selke, Ruth. (1976). Gezeiten: Gedichte in deutscher Sprache. New York: Abaris Books.
