= Michael S. Porder =

American psychoanalyst (1933–2021)

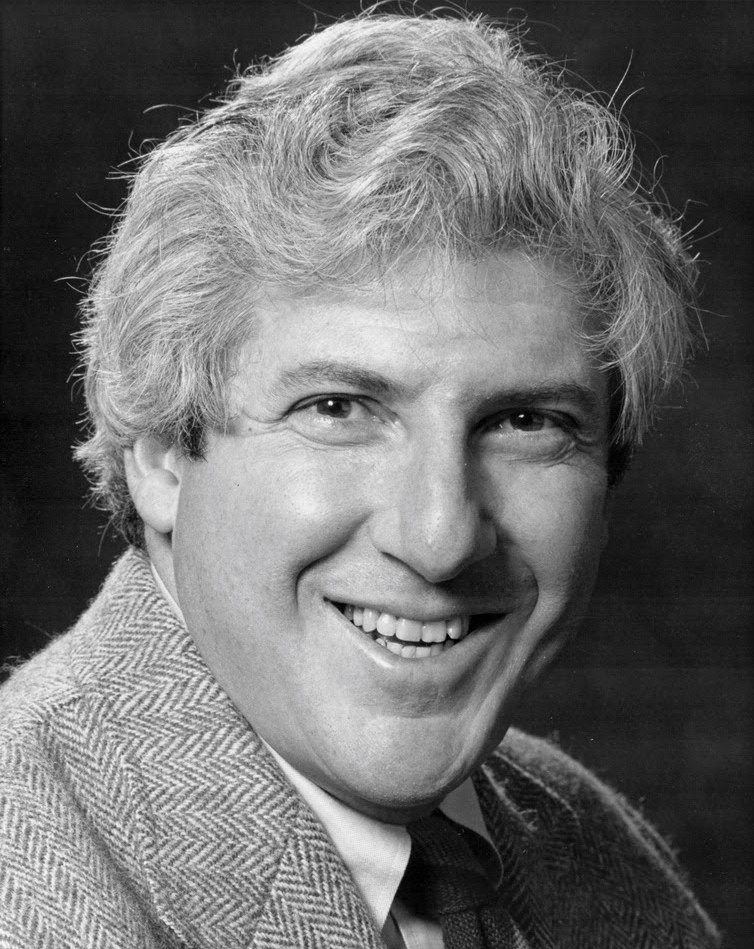
- Born: August 14, 1933; Boston, Massachusetts
- Died: October 15, 2021 (aged 88)
- Occupation: Psychoanalyst
- Known for: Involvement in the New York Psychoanalytic Institute

Academic background
- Education: Andover (High School); Harvard University (B.A.); Columbia College of Physicians and Surgeons (M.D.)

Academic work
- Discipline: Psychoanalysis
- Sub-discipline: Classical ego psychology
- Institutions: New York Psychoanalytic Society & Institute
- Main interests: Ego psychological approaches to more disturbed patients
- Notable works: Bipolar Patients: Psychoanalytic Perspectives

Michael S. Porder, M.D. (August 14, 1933 – October 15, 2021), was an American psychoanalyst and psychiatrist best known for his involvement in the New York Psychoanalytic Society & Institute. In 1983, he coauthored the book Borderline Patients: Psychoanalytic Perspectives, a monograph of the institute’s Kris Study Group, which attempts to apply classical ego psychological approaches to borderline psychopathology.

== Early life and education ==
Porder was born in Boston, Massachusetts in 1933. In 1958, he earned his medical degree from Columbia University College of Physicians and Surgeons. He did his internship in medicine at New England Center Hospital and his residency in psychiatry at Jacobi Hospital. He served as a captain in the United States Army between 1962 and 1964 and was stationed at Fort Ord. By 1964, he opened a psychoanalytic practice in New York City and trained at the New York Psychoanalytic Institute between 1964 and 1969.

== Career ==
=== Academic positions ===
Porder held various academic positions over his career, including assistant clinical professor of psychiatry at Albert Einstein College of Medicine (1965–1990), associate clinical professor of psychiatry at Mount Sinai School of Medicine (1990–2000), and lecturer in psychiatry at Columbia University College of Physicians and Surgeons (1965–1990). He was also a member of the editorial board of The Psychoanalytic Quarterly and a member of the Center for Advanced Psychoanalytic Studies.

=== New York Psychoanalytic Society & Institute ===
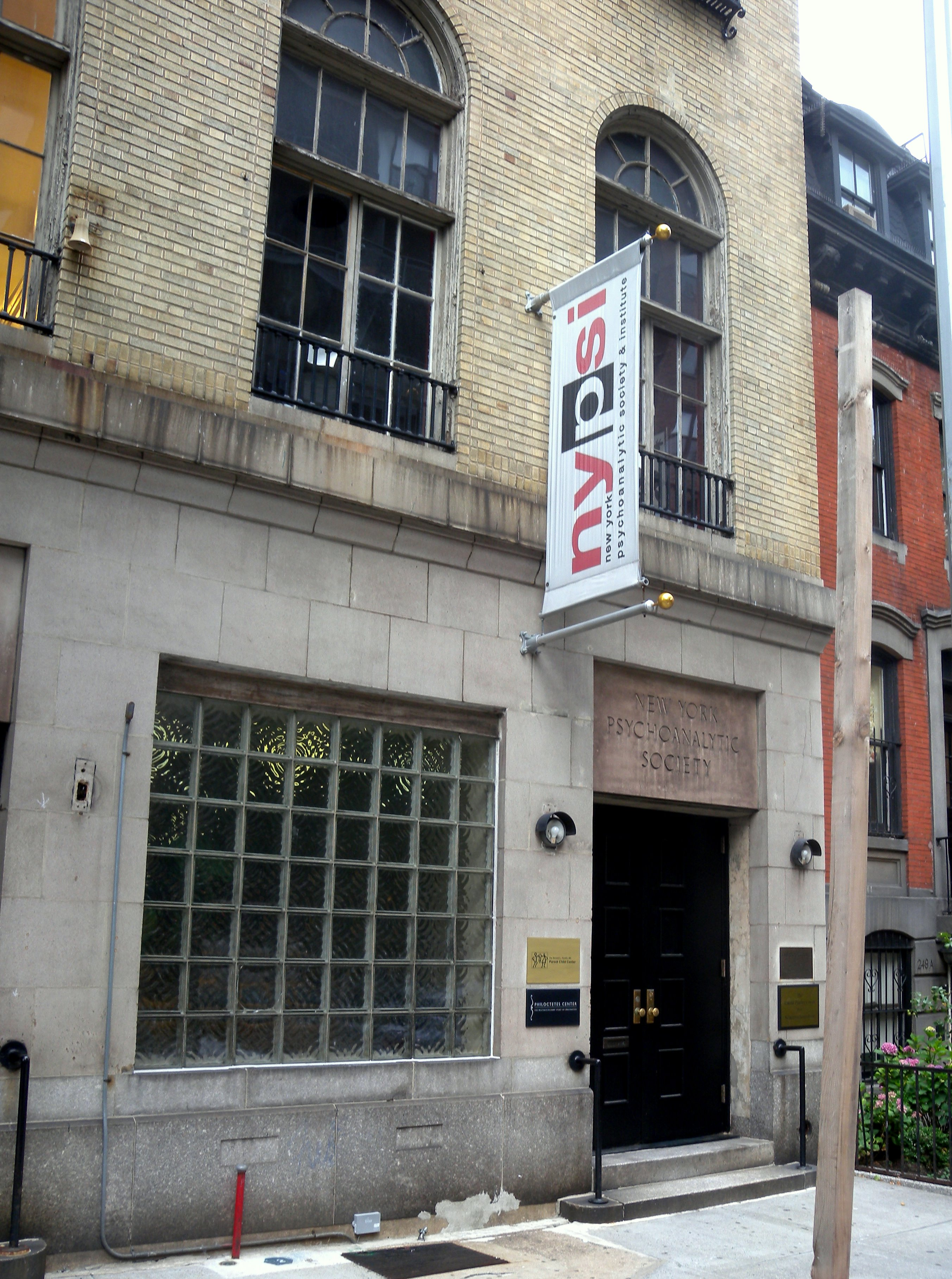
New York Psychoanalytic Society & Institute

Porder joined the New York Psychoanalytic Institute in 1964. His work at the institute focused primarily on applying psychoanalytic approaches to disturbed or “less-than-optimal” patients. Theodore J. Jacobs, a member of the institute since 1967, has described the types of patients Porder worked with as those "whose basic fundamental growth and structure of the mind was disturbed early on so that they did not develop... a solid ego."

Porder later joined a study group at the institute named PG 124, convened by Sander M. Abend, which included among its membership Charles Brenner, Leo Stone, and Manuel Furer. Porder used the group as a testing ground for unusual cases, writing, “It was an opportunity for me to see how [my colleagues] would adapt to treating a less-than-optimal patient.” He attributed his interest in these “less-than-optimal” cases to his residency work at Jacobi Hospital, where he practiced the psychoanalytic method on disturbed patients in the hospital wards.

In 1967, Porder joined the institute’s Kris Study Groups, named after Austrian psychoanalyst Ernst Kris. Porder participated in a Kris Study Group on sublimation (1967–1969); one on early physical illnesses, congenital deformities, and their relationships to analyzability (1969–1971); and one on borderline states (1973–1977). It was in the latter group that he researched and wrote his book, Borderline Patients: Psychoanalytic Perspectives, along with coauthors Sander M. Abend and Martin S. Willick.

Overall, Porder’s work has been characterized as being rigorously based on case material rather than on theory or philosophy, an approach that placed him within a larger movement of data-driven analysis that was gaining favor at the institute over theory-based, European schools. Notably, Porder was also known for separating himself from the institute's jockeying, political atmosphere, which he would later describe as markedly “unpleasant” but also “inevitable in every institution.”

=== Borderline Patients: Psychoanalytic Perspectives ===
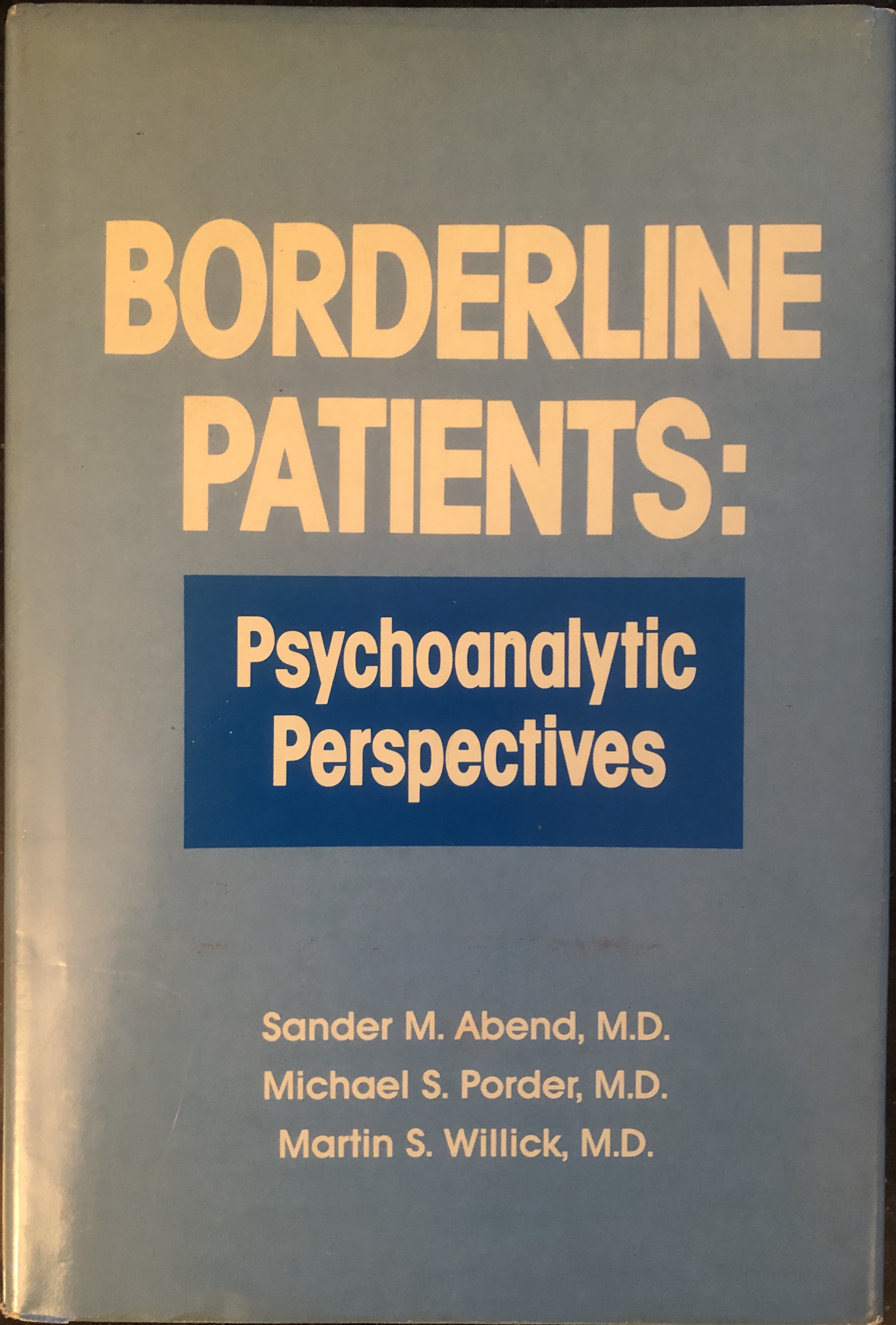
Borderline Patients: Psychoanalytic Perspectives

In 1983, Porder, Abend, and Willick coauthored the seventh monograph of the Kris Study Group, titled Borderline Patients: Psychoanalytic Perspectives. It has been described by Charles Brenner as “a classic in the field… [containing] profound and incisive discussion of the important aspects of ego functioning.” The book utilizes research from a study conducted by the Kris Study Group between 1973 and 1977 on patients on the healthier end of the borderline continuum, and it assesses them with an ego psychological approach, organizing its findings around the topics of object relations, reality testing, defenses, transference, technique, and etiology. The authors propose that borderline is not a clearcut diagnostic entity, but rather a broader category with various symptoms and etiologies, and that therefore no single treatment approach for all such patients is justified.

In Dan H. Buie's 1985 review of the book, he described the authors’ findings as follows:

The authors found that the four borderline patients psychologically differed from neurotic patients only quantitatively, not qualitatively. These borderlines shared with neurotics the same libidinal and aggressive, object-relational issues, the same difficulties with reality testing, the same defences, and the same transferences; treatment involved the same techniques, and there were no fundamental differences in aetiology. For many readers these conclusions are stunning.

The book in part was a response to the work of Otto F. Kernberg on borderline patients, particularly the Menninger Psychotherapy Research Project of 1972. One of the book’s central claims is that Kernberg's conceptualizations related to borderline patients were merely phenomenological descriptions or generalities and could not be confirmed by the Kris Study Group data. Instead, the authors felt that ideas from classical analysis were sufficient as explanations. Some contemporaries, including William W. Meissner, observed that the book was structured as a dialogue with Kernberg. Porder himself also considered the book a challenge to Kernberg, particularly on the specificity of, in Kernberg’s terms, “borderline personality organization.” The authors imply that the etiology of borderline disorder is not located exclusively in early developmental stages but rather throughout all stages of development. Porder later stated that the book’s “major point was that these patients have conflicts from all levels of psychic development and not only focused on the first and second year of life which Kernberg believed.”

Dating back at least to the 1950s, there had been ongoing discussions at the New York Psychoanalytic Institute about the expanding scope of indications for psychoanalysis, discussions which gained further steam due to the influx of ideas from Europe including Kleinian analysis. Porder’s book stimulated critiques about this widening applicability, and initial reactions were polarized. A 1988 issue of Psychoanalytic Inquiry was dedicated to commentaries on the book and its topics. Some reviewers critiqued the theoretical framework as well as the selection of patients, which excluded severe cases. James S. Grotstein in 1988 noted a lack of consideration of the ideas of Donald Winnicott and others, writing, "I regret what I believe to be an ill-informed dismissal of other schools." In 1985, Melvin Singer commented on the selection of patients, stating that, “Unfortunately, by choosing healthier cases to salvage an analytic data base, the authors have sacrificed the opportunity to directly address the major conceptual and treatment dilemmas.” Others considered the selection of patients to be intentional, pointing out that the authors acknowledge that more serious borderline patients would not be treatable under classically conducted analyses and that the patients selected in fact provided greater insights than otherwise would have been achievable. Dan H. Buie wrote of the selection:

[The authors] feel that analysis of patients on the less severe end of the borderline spectrum reveals more about it than psychotherapy with more severely ill borderlines, since the difference between patients on the two ends impresses them as more of degree than of kind. Thus, although the analyzed patients they present appear to have severe neurotic character disorders, they extrapolate from their experiences with these healthier patients to the ‘core’ and even the psychotic end of the continuum.

Some critiques in the years following publication related to the book’s challenge to Kernberg’s work. Meissner contended that "Kernberg and the Kris group are looking at and working with patients who represent different ranges within the borderline spectrum, so that their respective observations... are dictated more by the nature of the underlying pathology than by any verifiable theoretical differences." Meissner also felt that the book's definition of borderline pathology itself differed from Kernberg's. Another critique postulated that the formulation of internalized objects and defects described by Kernberg yielded more explanatory value in borderline cases than classical ego psychology could.

Some of these critiques were representative of ongoing, generational battles between European and American schools of Freudian analysis during that era. Theodore J. Jacobs, who was present at the New York Psychoanalytic Institute when the book was published, has described it as "innovative" and "an important contribution,” noting that overall it was well-received at the time.

=== Other contributions ===
Over his career, Porder published and lectured on multiple topics including projective identification and transference, object relations, and modern conflict theory. He also published meeting notes and findings of the New York Psychoanalytic Institute, authored book chapters including on the topic of identification, lectured on psychoanalytic viewpoints of borderline patients, published on clinical practice, and wrote book reviews. He was a popular supervisor and teacher at the New York Psychoanalytic Institute, and as a clinician, he was known for his flexibility and his leveraging of personal values as a means of improving the lives of patients in human terms.

Porder's 1996 lecture on object loss, published in the Journal of Clinical Psychoanalysis under the title "Fear of Object Loss as a Resistance to Change in Analysis" (2002), has long been admired among his students for shedding light on important aspects of resistance to change. His 1987 publication in The Psychoanalytic Quarterly, titled "Projective Identification: An Alternative Hypothesis," was described by Theodore J. Jacobs as an "important contribution that helped people clinically to... apply the abstract concept of projective identification."

Jacobs lamented, though, in reference to all of Porder's papers, that at that time "they were not heralded as great contributions" and that to date they still do not "receive the appreciation that they deserve."

== Personal life ==
Porder had four biological children, Deborah Porder, Joseph Porder, Jennifer Gurvits, and Stephen Porder. He also had one adopted child, Melissa Heckler, and two step-children, Peter Lonergan and filmmaker Kenneth Lonergan. He was a lifelong Boston Red Sox fan.

== Selected works ==
- Abend, Porder, Willick (1983). Borderline Patients: Psychoanalytic Perspectives. The Kris Study Group of the New York Psychoanalytic Institute, Monograph Vii International University Press, Inc. ISBN 0-8236-0576-0.
- Porder, Michael S. (1987). "Projective Identification: An Alternative Hypothesis". The Psychoanalytic Quarterly. 56(3): 431–451.
- Porder, Michael (1992). "The Psychoanalytic View of the Borderline Process". American Journal of Psychoanalysis 52(4):372–373.
- Porder, M.S. (2002). "Fear of Object Loss as a Resistance to Change in Analysis". Journal of Clinical Psychoanalysis. 11(3): 339–357.
- Porder, M.S. (2003). "What Analysts Do: Interpretation and Beyond". Journal of Clinical Psychoanalysis, 12:179–189
- Porder, M. (1994). "Clinical Considerations of the More Disturbed Patient". Journal of Clinical Psychoanalysis., 3:353–361.
- Abend, S. M. & Porder, M. S. (1986). "Identification in the Neuroses". The International Journal of Psychoanalysis, 67(2):201–208.
