= Edith Jacobson =

American physician

- Born: Edith Jacobssohn; September 10, 1897; Haynau, German Empire
- Died: December 8, 1978 (aged 81); Rochester, New York, U.S.
- Known for: Revised drive theory
- Scientific career
- Fields: Psychoanalysis
- Workplaces: Berlin Psychoanalytic Institute, New York Psychoanalytic Society and Institute

Edith Jacobson (German: Edith Jacobssohn; September 10, 1897 – December 8, 1978) was a German psychoanalyst. Her major contributions to psychoanalytic thinking dealt with the development of the sense of identity and self-esteem and with an understanding of depression and psychosis. She was able to integrate the tripartite structural model of classic psychoanalysis with the theory of object relations into a revised drive theory. Thereby, she increased the treatment possibilities of the more disturbed pre-oedipal patients.

== Biography ==
Born into a Jewish family to a physician father and musician mother, Edith Jacobson was a physician and later she became also a psychoanalyst. In 1922 she received her medical degree, after she attended medical school at Jena, Heidelberg, and at Munich. From 1922 until 1925 she did her pediatric internship at the University Hospital in Heidelberg. She developed interest in psychoanalysis during that period. In her internship she observed instances of childhood sexuality. She began training at the Berlin Psychoanalytic Institute in 1925 and her analyst was Otto Fenichel.

In 1930, she became a member of the Berlin Psychoanalytic Society and was soon presenting papers that dealt with her interest in the problems of the superego and its development. In 1934 she became a training analyst at the Berlin Institute.

In 1935, the Nazis imprisoned Jacobson because she refused to divulge information about a patient. In 1938, she became ill with Graves' disease and diabetes; while hospitalised in Leipzig, she escaped to Czechoslovakia. Shortly after her escape, she emigrated to the U.S., where she soon became a member of the New York Psychoanalytic Society. In the U.S., she became a training analyst and a teacher.

Jacobson's theoretical and clinical work was about ego and superego functioning, the processes of identification underlying the development of ego and superego, and the role of the ego and superego in depression. In her writings, she tries to construct an overarching developmental perspective. This perspective would do justice to drives and to real objects and their representations in building up the ego and superego. Jacobson was interested in the fate of self-representations in depressive and psychotic patients. She introduced the concept of self-representation with Heinz Hartmann. In 1964, The Self and the Object World, she presented a revised drive theory.

== Revised drive theory ==
Jacobson was the first theorist to attempt to integrate drive theory with structural and object relations theory in a comprehensive, developmental synthesis, and her influence on subsequent work in this area has been profound. She built on the contributions of Anna Freud, Heinz Hartmann, René Spitz, and Margaret Mahler. In 1964, she wrote The Self and the Object World, in which she revised Sigmund Freud's theory about the psychosexual phases in the development, and his conceptualizations of id, ego, and superego.

=== General concepts of the revised drive theory ===
In Freud's point of view, drives were innate, while the ego psychologists emphasized the influence of the environment. Jacobson found a way to bridge the gap between those points of view. According to Jacobson, biology and experience mutually influence each other, and interact throughout the development.

In accordance with Hartmann, Jacobson proposed that the instinctual drives are not innate ‘givens’, but biological predisposed, innate potentials. These potentials get their distinctive features in the context of the early experiences of the child. From birth on, experiences will be registered as pleasurable (‘feeling good’) or unpleasurable (‘feeling bad’).

A balance in subjective feeling states in the early experiences of the child will contribute to the harmonious development of the libido and aggressive drive. The libido will emerge from experiences of feeling good and normally there will be less aggression. However, if early experiences are particularly frustrating, the aggressive drive might disturb the normal development. The libido helps integrating images of good and bad objects and good and bad self. Aggression, on the other hand, facilitates separation and establishing different images of self and others. Libido and aggression cannot function without each other. Libido promotes pulling together, and aggression moving out. Libido and aggression are necessary to build a stable identity by integrating experiences from the environment.

Jacobson articulated that experiences are subjective, which means that there is no good mothering, but only mothering that feels good to a particular baby. It is all about ‘affective matching’ between mother and child, in which factors like baby's temperament, fit or misfit between baby and mother and the mother's capacity to respond adequately to the baby's needs, play an important role.

=== Development of the child ===
The early psychic state of a child is undifferentiated, with no clear boundaries between the inner self and the outer world. Libido and aggression are not experienced as distinct drives. As a newborn child cannot differentiate between self and others, the earliest images are fused and confused. Jacobson proposed – in agreement with René Spitz – that experiences, whether they are good or bad, will accumulate in a child's psyche. These earliest images form the groundwork for later subjective feelings of self and others and will serve as a filter through which one will interpret new experiences.

At the age of approximately 6 months a baby is capable of differentiating between self and others. Gradually, the aggressive and libidinal components also become more differentiated, which leads to new structural systems: the ego and the superego. In the second year, there is a gradual transition to individuation and ego autonomy, in which the representations of the child become more realistic. The child discovers its own identity and learns to differentiate wishful from realistic self and object images. The Superego develops over a long time and becomes consolidated during adolescence.

In normal development, there is a balance between libido and aggression, which lead to a mature differentiation between self and other. However, a lack of balance between libido and aggression could lead to weak boundaries between self and other, which can be observed in psychotic patients.

With regard to the development of the Ego and Superego Jacobson stressed the role of parental influence as crucial. Parental love is the best guarantee for a normal ego and superego development, but also frustrations and parental demands make a significant contribution to the development of an effective, independently functioning and self-reliant Ego.

== Bibliography ==
- The Self and the Object World, (1964).
- Psychotic Conflict and Reality, (1967).
- Depression: comparative studies of normal, neurotic, and psychotic conditions, (1971).

== See also ==
- Drive Theory
- Psychoanalysis
- Object relations theory
- Id, ego, and superego
- Sigmund Freud
- Anna Freud
- Heinz Hartmann
