= Regression (psychology) =

Mental defence mechanism in psychoanalysis

In psychoanalytic theory, regression is a defense mechanism involving the reversion of the ego to an earlier stage of psychosexual development, as a reaction to an overwhelming external problem or internal conflict.

Sigmund Freud invoked the notion of regression in relation to his theory of dreams (1900) and sexual perversions (1905), but the concept itself was first elaborated in his paper "The Disposition to Obsessional Neurosis" (1913). In 1914, he added a paragraph to The Interpretation of Dreams that distinguished three kinds of regression, which he called topographical regression, temporal regression, and formal regression.

== Freud, regression, and neurosis ==
Freud saw inhibited development, fixation, and regression as centrally formative elements in the creation of a neurosis. Arguing that "the libidinal function goes through a lengthy development", he assumed that "a development of this kind involves two dangers – first, of inhibition, and secondly, of regression". Inhibitions produced fixations, and the "stronger the fixations on its path of development, the more readily will the function evade external difficulties by regressing to the fixations".

Neurosis for Freud was thus the product of a flight from an unsatisfactory reality "along the path of involution, of regression, of a return to earlier phases of sexual life, phases from which at one time satisfaction was not withheld. This regression appears to be a twofold one: a temporal one, in so far as the libido, the erotic needs, hark back to stages of development that are earlier in time, and a formal one, in that the original and primitive methods of psychic expression are employed in manifesting those needs".

Behaviors associated with regression can vary greatly depending upon the stage of fixation: one at the oral stage might result in excessive eating or smoking, or verbal aggression, whereas one at the anal stage might result in excessive tidiness or messiness. Freud recognised that "it is possible for several fixations to be left behind in the course of development, and each of these may allow an irruption of the libido that has been pushed off – beginning, perhaps, with the later acquired fixations, and going on, as the lifestyle develops, to the original ones".

== In the service of the ego ==
Ernst Kris supplements Freud's general formulations with a specific notion of "regression in the service of the ego"...the specific means whereby preconscious and unconscious material appear in the creator's consciousness'. Kris thus opened the way for ego psychology to take a more positive view of regression. Carl Jung had earlier argued that 'the patient's regressive tendency...is not just a relapse into infantilism, but an attempt to get at something necessary...the universal feeling of childhood innocence, the sense of security, of protection, of reciprocated love, of trust'. Kris however was concerned rather to differentiate the way that 'Inspiration -...in which the ego controls the primary process and puts it into its service – needs to be contrasted with the opposite...condition, in which the ego is overwhelmed by the primary process'.

Nevertheless his view of regression in the service of the ego could be readily extended into a quasi-Romantic image of the creative process, in which 'it is only in the fiery storm of a profound regression, in the course of which the personality undergoes both dissolution of structure and reorganization, that the genius becomes capable of wresting himself from the traditional pattern that he had been forced to integrate through the identifications necessitated and enforced by the oedipal constellation'.

From there it was perhaps only a small step to the 1960s valorisation of regression as a positive good in itself. 'In this particular type of journey, the direction we have to take is back and in....They will say we are regressed and withdrawn and out of contact with them. True enough, we have a long, long way to back to contact the reality'. Jungians had however already warned that 'romantic regression meant a surrender to the non-rational side which had to be paid for by a sacrifice of the rational and individual side'; and Freud for his part had dourly noted that 'this extraordinary plasticity of mental developments is not unrestricted in direction; it may be described as a special capacity for involution – regression – since it may well happen that a later and higher level of development, once abandoned, cannot be reached again'.

== Later views ==
Anna Freud (1936) ranked regression first in her enumeration of the defense mechanisms', and similarly suggested that people act out behaviors from the stage of psychosexual development in which they are fixated. For example, an individual fixated at an earlier developmental stage might cry or sulk upon hearing unpleasant news.

Michael Balint distinguishes between two types of regression: a nasty "malignant" regression that the Oedipal level neurotic is prone to... and the "benign" regression of the basic-fault patient. The problem then is what the analyst can do 'to ensure that his patient's regression should be therapeutic and any danger of a pathological regression avoided'.

Others have highlighted the technical dilemmas of dealing with regression from different if complementary angles. On the one hand, making premature 'assumptions about the patient's state of regression in the therapy...regarded as still at the breast', for example, might block awareness of more adult functioning on the patient's part: of the patient's view of the therapist '. The opposite mistake would be 'justifying a retreat from regressive material presented by a patient. When a patient begins to trust the analyst or therapist it will be just such disturbing aspects of the internal world that will be presented for understanding – not for a panic retreat by the therapist'.

Peter Blos suggested that 'revisiting of early psychic positions...helps the adolescent come out of the family envelope', and that 'Regression during adolescence thus advances the cause of development'. Stanley Olinick speaks of 'regression in the service of the other' on the part of the analyst 'during his or her clinical work. Such ego regression is a pre-condition for empathy'.

Demonstration of pain, impairment, etc. also relates to regression. When regression becomes the cornerstone of a personality and the life strategy for overcoming problems, it leads to such an infantile personality.

== In fiction ==
- A clear example of regressive behavior in fiction can be seen in J.D. Salinger's The Catcher in the Rye. Holden constantly contradicts the progression of time and the aging process by reverting to childish ideas of escape, unrealistic expectations and frustration produced by his numerous shifts in behavior. His tendencies to reject responsibility and society as a whole because he 'doesn't fit in' also pushes him to prolonged use of reaction formation, unnecessary generalizations, and compulsive lying.
- A similar example occurs in Samuel Beckett's Krapp's Last Tape. Krapp is fixated on reliving earlier times, and reenacts the fetal condition in his 'den'. He is unable to form mature relationships with women, seeing them only as replacements for his deceased mother. He experiences physical ailments that are linked to his fetal complex, struggling to perform digestive functions on his own. This literal anal retentiveness exemplifies his inefficacy as an independent adult.

== See also ==
- Defence mechanism
- Displacement (psychology)
- Narcissistic withdrawal
- Psychological projection
- Psychological repression
- Rationalization (psychology)
- Reaction formation
