= Jenny Waelder Hall =

American psychologist

Jenny Waelder Hall (1898–1989) was a pioneer of child psychoanalysis. She was analysed by Sigmund Freud and supervised by Anna Freud.
