= Solnit =

Solnit is a surname. Notable people with the surname include:

- Albert J. Solnit (1919–2002), American psychoanalyst
- Rebecca Solnit (born 1961), American writer
