= Eva Cockcroft =

Artist, art historian and art critic

Eva Cockcroft (September 27, 1936 – April 1, 1999) was an artist, art historian, art critic and photojournalist who taught art history and studio art at California State University, Long Beach and the University of California Irvine. She painted numerous murals in Los Angeles, New Jersey, New York, Nicaragua and Germany and was the co-author of Towards a Peoples Art: The Contemporary Mural Movement. Her essay "Abstract Expressionism, Weapon of the Cold War" first published in 1974 in Artforum has remained at the heart of debate about the political implications of post-war American art.

== Biography ==
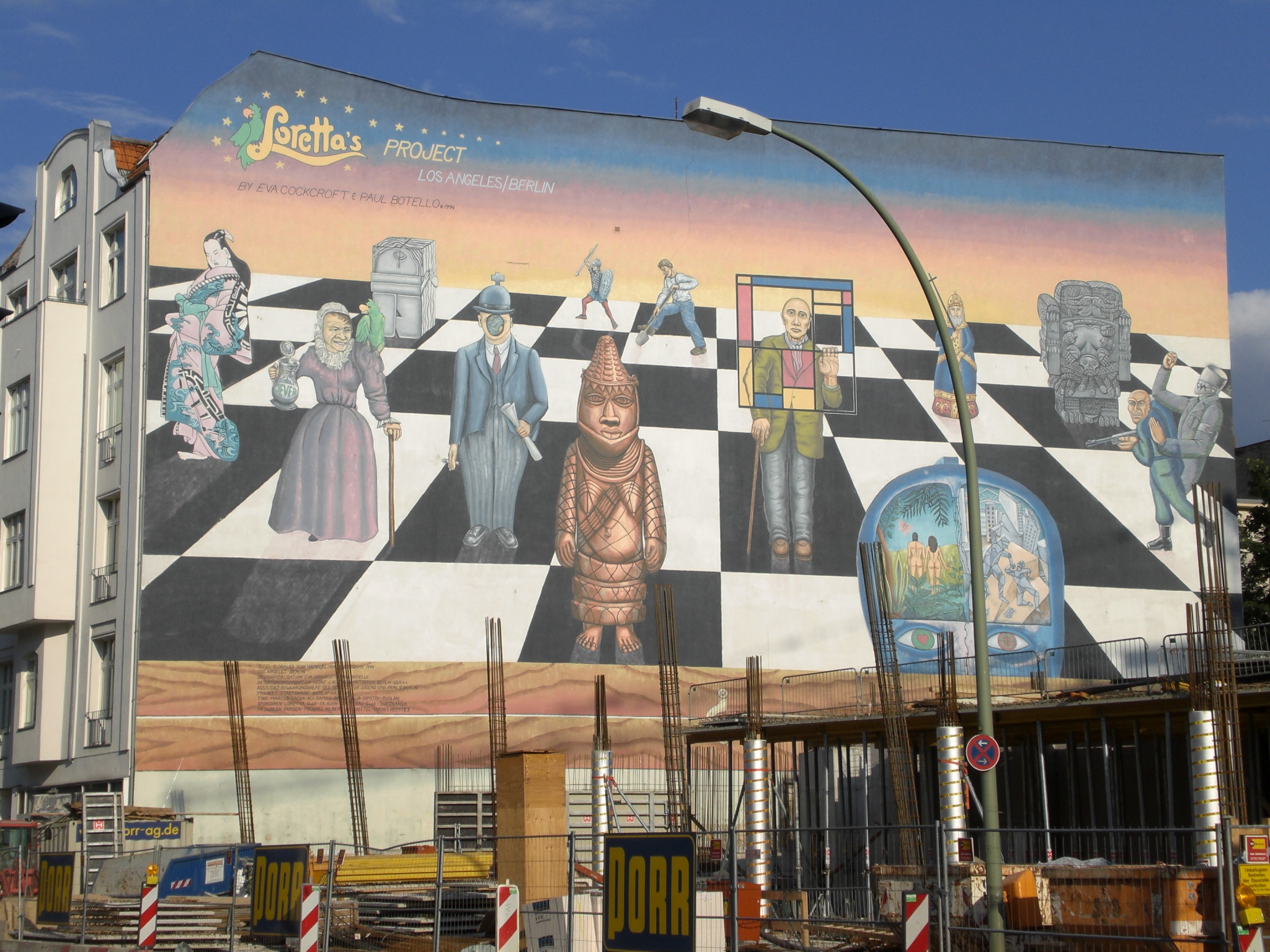
Cockcroft's mural in Berlin (2008)

Eva Cockcroft was born Eva Sperling in Vienna, Austria. Her parents were Otto and Melita Sperling who studied with Anna Freud. Her family fled Austria to the United States in 1938.

She studied English at Cornell University and art history at Rutgers University.

Some of her most prominent murals include La Grande Jatte in Harlem (1986) and Earth Memory (1996).

She was the co-founder of the artist collective Artmakers Inc., an artists' group in New York City that helped neighborhoods to create murals reflecting their own experience.

She died from breast cancer on April 1, 1999.
