= Robert C. Bak =

Robert C. Bak (born Bak Róbert; 14 October 1908, Budapest – 15 September 1974, New York City) was a Hungarian-born psychoanalyst who moved to the United States in 1941, and eventually became President of the New York Psychoanalytic Society.

== Training and career ==
Bak underwent a training analysis with Imre Hermann and joined the Hungarian Psychoanalytic Society in 1938, only to be forced to flee to the United States a few years later, where he became a training analyst in 1947, and president of the New York Psychoanalytic Society in 1957.

He published some 25 articles in Hungarian, German, and English. From the start, Bak was concerned to chart early object relations, and their distortions: he saw the sexual perversions as attempts to undo object separation, and also charted the emergence of grandiosity in ego-regression.

Bak also reiterated the importance of the idea of the phallic mother in the perverse denial of castration.

== Characteristics ==
Bak was described as a lover of the good life, he experienced difficulties in his marriage and had no children.

When asked whether or not he would describe as transference a relationship in which each party saw the other through a veil of unconscious fantasy, instead of as they were, he is said to have replied ironically, "I'd call that life".

== Selected writings ==
- 'Dissolution of the Ego, Mannerism and Delusion of Grandeur' Journal of Nervous and Medical Disease XCVIII (1943)
- 'The Phallic Woman' Psychoanalytic Study of the Child 23 (1968)

== See also ==
- Attila József
- Hypochondriasis
- Margaret Mahler
