= Kurt R. Eissler =

Kurt Robert Eissler (German: [ˈaɪslɐ]; 2 July 1908, Vienna – 17 February 1999, New York City) was an Austrian psychoanalyst and a scholar and archivist of the work and life of Sigmund Freud.

== Training and contributions ==
K. R. Eissler took a PhD in psychology at Vienna University in 1934 and underwent a training analysis with August Aichhorn. His first psychoanalytic contribution, an article on early female development, was published in 1939, to be followed by others on anorexia nervosa and shock treatment. With the Anschluss, Eissler moved to the United States with his wife, fellow psychoanalyst Ruth Selke Eissler. There he developed into a combative supporter of the Freudian theory. Of his twelve, often heated and extensive books, about half dealt with issues in Freud's life and work, the other half with figures from high culture such as Shakespeare and Goethe.

Eissler provided a spirited defense of the death drive, and introduced the term "parameter" to codify deviations from pure interpretation in the Freudian tradition.

He saw creative art as emanating from an asocial element in the artist's mind, and as offering a form of conflict-resolution that need not be shared by the artist themselves. He also considered that some forms of regression were of benefit to the artist in enabling them to break out of "the traditional pattern that he has been forced to integrate through the identifications necessitated and enforced by the oedipal constellation".

== The Sigmund Freud Archives ==
Eissler is also known for his work in establishing and filling the Sigmund Freud Archives, a wide-ranging collection of primary material relating to the life of Freud. Eissler's administration of the collection has attracted some controversy. The historian Peter Gay, although commending Eissler for his industry in preserving so much otherwise scattered and ephemeral material, was critical of his policy of restricting scholarly access to the material. Freud historian Peter J. Swales also objected to the restrictions that Eissler imposed.

Controversy also surrounded his choice of Jeffrey Moussaieff Masson as his successor for the Sigmund Freud Archives.

== Characteristics ==
Janet Malcolm described Eissler as a "singular mixture of brilliance, profundity, originality, and moral beauty on the one hand, and willfulness, stubbornness, impetuosity, and maddening guilelessness on the other". He was also an atheist.

== Selected publications ==
=== Articles ===
- 'On Certain Problems of Female Sexual Development' Psychoanalytic Quarterly VIII (1939)
- 'Psychopathology and Creativity', American Imago 24 (1967)
- 'Death Drive, Ambivalence, and Narcissism', The Psychoanalytic Study of the Child XXVI (1971)

=== Books ===
- Goethe: A Psychoanalytic Study (1963)
- Medical Orthodoxy and the Future of Psychoanalysis (1965)
- Talent and Genius: The Fictitious Case of Tausk Contra Freud (1971)
- Three Instances of Injustice (1993)
- Freud and the Seduction Theory: A Brief Love Affair (2001)

== See also ==
- Ego psychology
- Franz Alexander
- Heinz Kohut
- Lay analysis
- Muriel Gardiner
