= Edith Banfield Jackson =

- Born: 1895
- Died: 1977 (aged 81–82)
- Education: Vassar College; Johns Hopkins University
- Occupations: Child psychiatrist, pediatrician
- Medical career
- Field: Child psychiatry, psychoanalysis
- Institutions: Yale School of Medicine; Grace-New Haven Community Hospital; Colorado General Hospital
- Sub-specialties: Rooming-in maternal and infant care
- Notable works: Development of the rooming-in model

Edith Banfield Jackson (1895–1977) was a child psychiatrist who developed the rooming-in model of maternal and infant care. Jackson was professor in pediatrics and psychology at the Yale School of Medicine from 1936 to 1959. She directed the Yale Rooming-in Research Project at Grace-New Haven Community Hospital from 1946 to 1953. Upon retiring from Yale, Jackson moved to Colorado, where she directed the Rooming-in Unit at Colorado General Hospital from 1962 to 1970.

== Education ==
Edith Banfield Jackson graduated from Vassar College in 1916 and received a medical degree from Johns Hopkins University in 1921. She held medical internships at the State University of Iowa Hospital (where she was the only woman intern) and at Bellevue Hospital in New York City. Jackson traveled to Austria in December 1929 where she underwent six years of analysis with Sigmund Freud and trained in child analysis at the Vienna Psychoanalytic Institute with his daughter, Anna. In 1937 she provided funding for the Jackson Nursery for children under the age of two which, under the directorship of Anna Freud, made observational studies on early child development. Jackson was also actively engaged in clandestine operations for Viennese Jews trying to emigrate from Nazi occupied Vienna.

== Maternal and infant care ==
The impersonal nature of hospital maternity care concerned Jackson. Influenced by her psychiatric training, primarily attachment theory, she worked to eradicate the common practice of separating newborn infants from their mothers and fathers upon birth. "Rooming-in" allowed newborns to stay in the same hospital room with their mothers, and encouraged parents to care for their infant immediately from birth. In addition, Edith Jackson was a proponent of natural childbirth, breastfeeding, and prenatal instruction. She worked with hospital staff to encourage and develop these policies.

Jackson and other hospital staff members wrote a pamphlet called "Management of Breast-Feeding"; hospitals all over the country used it as a resource. In the decades after Jackson's innovative Rooming-in Project began, her approach to childbirth has become the norm at hospitals across the United States and around the world.

Because of her accomplishments, the Edith B. Jackson Childcare Center connected to Yale University is named for her.

== Writings ==
- "Treatment of the Young Child," American Journal of Orthopsychiatry v. 12 (1942).
- "General Reaction of Mothers and Nurses to Rooming-in," American Journal of Public Health v. 38, no. 5 (May 1948)
- "Pediatric and Psychiatric Aspects of the Yale Rooming-in Project," Connecticut State Medical Journal v. 14, no 7 (1950)
- "Methodology of the Yale Rooming-in Project on Parent-Child Relationship," American Journal of Orthopsychiatry v. 25, nos. 1-2 (1955)
