= Rudolph Loewenstein (psychoanalyst) =

Polish-American psychoanalyst

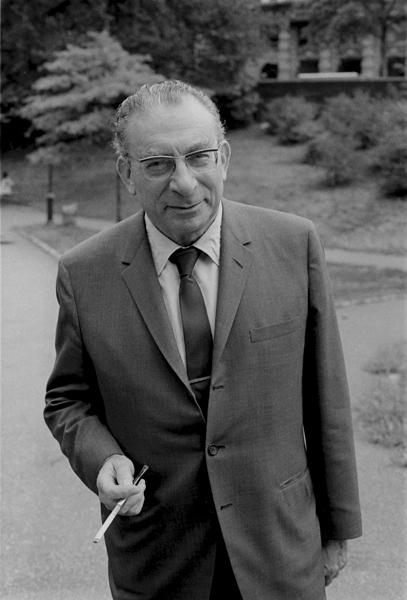
- Born: Rudolph Maurice Loewenstein; January 17, 1898; Łódź, Congress Poland, Russian Empire
- Died: April 14, 1976 (aged 78); New York City, US
- Occupation: Psychoanalyst
- Spouses: Marie-Elisabeth Schmitt (m. 1932–1937) Marquess Amalia Pallavicini (m. 1938–1946) Elisabeth Geleerd (m. 1947; died 1969)

Rudolph Maurice Loewenstein (January 17, 1898 – April 14, 1976) was an American psychoanalyst who practiced in Germany, France, and the United States.

== Biography ==
Loewenstein was born in Łódź, Poland (then in the Russian Empire), to a Jewish family from the province of Galicia.

After graduating from his university studies in Zurich Switzerland from 1917 to 1920, he went to Berlin to study medicine where he received his medical diploma, specializing in neurology and studying under Eugen Bleuler. At this time he became acquainted with psychoanalysis where he was certified as a psychoanalyst after undergoing a training analysis with Hanns Sachs. He became a member of the German Psychoanalytic Society. (DPG) in 1925.

At the request of Sigmund Freud, Loewenstein moved to Paris, France in 1927 in order to train new analysts. He was the second licensed psychoanalyst, after Eugenie Sokolnicka, to practice there. He trained most of the first two generations of French analysts, including, notably, Jacques Lacan (between 1933 and 1939). He was a founding member and also secretary of the first French psychoanalytic society, the Société psychanalytique de Paris (SPP). (Some of the other founding members included René Laforgue, Marie Bonaparte, Raymond de Saussure, and Angelo Hesnard.) In 1927, he participated in the creation of the SPP's journal, the Revue française de psychanalyse; and in 1928 he and Marie Bonaparte translated Freud's case-study of Dora into French.

In 1930, he became a French citizen by decree and obtained his medical license anew - defending his thesis for a doctorate in medicine in 1935. In 1939, he was mobilized as a doctor in the French army receiving the Croix-de-Guerre in 1940. After the Armistice, he fled to the south of France, and in 1942 left there with his family for the United States, where he settled in New York. There he pursued a distinguished institutional career with the International Psychoanalytic Association (IPA), becoming its vice president from 1965 to 1967.

He died in 1976 in New York City.

Loewenstein is known, along with Ernst Kris and Heinz Hartmann, as one of the foremost figures of what has been called Ego psychology.

== Family ==
He was married to Marie-Elisabeth Schmitt, with who he had two daughters, Dominique Therese and Elisabeth Charlotte. After her death he married Marquess Amalia Pallavicini, with who he had a daughter, Marie-Francoise. In 1947 he married a fellow psychoanalyst Elisabeth Geleerd with whom he had a son, Richard Joseph.

== Works ==
- Origine du masochisme et la théorie des pulsions, 1938
- The vital or somatic drives, 1940
- Psychanalyse de l'Antisemitisme, 1952
- (ed. with Heinz Hartmann and Ernst Kris), Notes on the theory of aggressions, 1949

== See also ==
- Daniel Lagache
