= Developmental lines =

Developmental lines is a metaphor of Anna Freud from her developmental theory to stress the continuous and cumulative character of childhood development. It emphasises the interactions and interdependencies between maturational and environmental determinants in developmental steps. The level that has been reached by the child on the developmental lines represents the result of interaction between drive and ego-superego development and their reaction to environmental influences; thus stressing the influence of the internal structures of the child as well as the environment of the child.

An individual is understood to be capable of moving back along developmental lines as well as forwards. This regressing can be necessary at times when the individual has to deal with some current, potentially overwhelming challenge. Once overcome, he or she can then move forward again. When pathology in a person is assessed, there are large discrepancies among the lines and notable lags with respect to normal progress along each line. However, a given behaviour may reflect a temporary aberration rather than a true symptom.

== Basic developmental line ==
Anna Freud initially distinguished six developmental lines. The line considered most 'basic' is one which describes the progression from dependency to emotional self-reliance and adult object relationship. It describes the changes at the level of observable mother-child relationships alongside the evolution of internal representations of objects that create templates for later relationships. Along this developmental line, the following stages are identified:

1. Biological unity between the mother-infant couple. The infant is under the assumption that the mother is a part of itself and is under its control, and the mother experiences the baby as psychologically part of her. Separation from the mother in this stage is thought to give rise to 'separation anxiety proper'. This first stage ends with the first year of life.
2. There is a need-fulfilling anaclitic relationship between the child and its object, which is based on the child's imperative body needs. It has a naturally fluctuating character as the need for the object increases with the arousal of drives, but the importance of the object for the child is reduced when satisfaction has been reached. The extent to which the child's needs are satisfied is thought to determine the images of a good and a bad mother. This stage of the developmental line starts at the second half of the first year of life.
3. The stage of object constancy: the child achieves a consistent representation of the mother, which can be maintained irrespective of the satisfaction of drives: thus, the representation of the mother is more stable. The child becomes able to form reciprocal relationships that can survive disappointments and frustrations.
4. The toddler's positive and negative feelings are focused on the same person and become visible (known as the 'terrible twos'). The child is in conflict: wishing both to be independent and to retain the complete devotion of the mother. In this stage, ambivalence is considered to be normal.
5. The so-called phallic-oedipal phase: this stage is object-centred, characterized by possessiveness of the parent of the opposite sex and jealousy and rivalry with the same sex parent. The child becomes aware that there are aspects of the relationship between the parents from which he is excluded.
6. The latency period: the urgency of the child's drives is reduced and there is a transfer of libido from parents to peers and others in the child's social environment and the community.
7. The preadolescent prelude to the 'adolescent revolt'. A regression from the reasonableness of latency children to a demanding, contrary, inconsiderate attitude characteristic of earlier stages, especially the part-object, need-fulfilling and ambivalent attitudes in behaviour. This strengthens oral, anal and phallic drive components, reviving infantile fantasies and intensifying intra-psychic conflict.
8. Adolescence: representing the ego's struggle to master the upsurge of sexuality and aggression during this period. Two new defence mechanisms (intellectualization and asceticism) emerge in adolescence to defend the individual from the instinctual demands of the body. The adolescent is preoccupied with its internal struggle to transfer emotional investment from parents to new objects.

== Examples of other developmental lines ==
- suckling to rational eating
- wetting and soiling to bladder and bowel control
- irresponsibility to responsibility in body management
- play: from body to toy to interpersonal activity to reading/sports/etc.

== Developmental lines and psychopathology ==
Anna Freud, in conceptualising the developmental lines was aware that children could not be expected to proceed evenly across all lines. As the forces determining the child's development are external as well as internal and largely outside the child's control, minor 'developmental disharmonies' are to be expected. However, gross disharmony can predispose to severe psychopathology, neurosis and non-neurotic personality disorders. Anna Freud outlines several examples of phase specific developmental disturbances with reference to the basic line delineated above. As such, in phase 1, an infringement of the biological mother-infant tie for whatever reason, for example through death or neglect, can lead to separation anxiety proper. Similarly, a serious failure on the mother's behalf to be reliable, need fulfilling and comfort-giving in phase 2 will cause breakdowns in individuation. Unsatisfactory libidinal relations to unstable love objects during phase 4 will disturb the balanced integration of libido and aggression which can lead to uncontrollable aggressive behaviour and destructiveness.

The framework of developmental lines has been very helpful in allowing us to track 'normal' and 'abnormal' development and has led to some interesting practical lessons. For example, Anna Freud writes that the clinging attitudes at the toddler stage (phase 4) are the result of pre-oedipal ambivalence, not of maternal spoiling as was thought. Further, in the pre-oedipal period (end of phase 4) parents cannot expect a mutuality in object relations as this belongs to the next phase and similarly, no child can be fully integrated in school before libido has been transferred from the parents to the community (phase 6). Developmental lines can also be useful in making predictions as to when particular events will have the greatest impact. For example, she lists the later part of phase 6 as one in which reactions to adoption would be particularly severe. This being because with the normal disillusionment with the parents, all children feel as if adopted and feelings about the reality of the adoption merge with the occurrence of “the family romance”.

== The developmental profile ==
On the basis of the concept of developmental lines Anna Freud developed the 'developmental profile'. The profile aims to classifying the individual within a diagnostic schema. A more detailed examination of the internal picture of the child which contains information about: the structure of the personality, the dynamic interplay within the structure, some economic factors concerning drive activity and the relative strength of id and ego forces, the adaptation to reality; and some genetic assumptions.

A developmental profile consists of the following parts:

1. Reasons (and circumstances) for referral. Description of symptoms.
2. Description of the child
3. Family background (past and present) and personal history
4. Possibly significant environmental circumstances
5. Assessment of development
6. Assessment of fixation points and regressions
7. Assessment of the conflicts
8. Assessment of some general characteristics
9. Diagnosis

== See also ==
- Anna Freud
- Psychoanalysis
