= Peter Blos =

German-American psychoanalyst

- Born: February 2, 1904; Karlsruhe
- Died: June 12, 1997 (aged 93); Holderness, New Hampshire, U.S.
- Education: University of Heidelberg (Bachelor's); University of Vienna (PhD)
- Known for: Pioneer of systematic study of child and adolescent psychological development; author of On Adolescence: A Psychoanalytic Interpretation
- Scientific career
- Fields: Psychoanalysis, child and Adolescent Psychology
- Workplaces: New York Psychoanalytical Society

Peter Blos (February 2, 1904 – June 12, 1997) was a German-American early psychoanalyst, a pioneer of a systematic approach to studying child and adolescent psychological development.

Born in Karlsruhe, Germany, Blos became friends at the age of 16 with Erik Erikson, with whom he later collaborated extensively. Blos studied education at the University of Heidelberg. After receiving the bachelor's degree, Blos was introduced to Anna Freud. She recommended Blos for a tutoring position to Bob Burlingham, the eldest child of psychoanalyst Dorothy Burlingham. Eventually, Blos became a director of an experimental psychoanalytical school for the children of Mrs. Burlingham, inviting Erik Erikson to assist him.

Later, Blos obtained a PhD in biology from the University of Vienna.

In 1934, Peter Blos fled to New Orleans, escaping a growing Nazi movement. Then he went to New York, advancing his analytical training there. Blos became part of the New York Psychoanalytical Society, becoming a special member in 1965. He presented and led a course on delayed adolescence from 1972 to 1977.

Dr. Blos published four books on adolescent development, delving deeply into the area Sigmund Freud touched on but hadn't developed enough. Finished by Blos in 1962, On Adolescence: A Psychoanalytic Interpretation became a foundational volume in the field, still widely studied.

Peter Blos died in 1997 at his home in Holderness, New Hampshire, at the age of 93.
