= Heinz Hartmann =

Austrian psychiatrist and psychoanalyst (1894–1970)

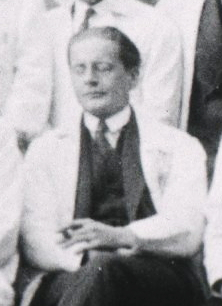
Heinz Hartmann in 1927

Heinz Hartmann (Austrian German: [ˈhartman]; November 4, 1894 – May 17, 1970) was an Austrian psychiatrist and psychoanalyst. He is considered one of the founders and principal representatives of ego psychology.

== Life ==
Hartmann was born in Vienna, Austria-Hungary, in 1894, to a well-known family of writers and academics. One grandfather, Moritz Hartmann, was a noted poet and professor and leader of the revolution of 1848. The other grandfather, Rudolph Chrobak, was a distinguished Viennese surgeon. Heinz Hartmann's own father, Ludo Moritz Hartmann, was a professor of history, an ambassador, and a founder of libraries and adult education. Heinz Hartmann's mother, Grete Hartmann (née Chrobak), was a noted pianist and sculptor. After completing secondary school, Hartmann entered the University of Vienna, where he received his medical degree in 1920. He became a psychiatrist in the Wagner-Jaurregg clinic, did research, and developed an interest in Freud and Freudian theories.

The death of Karl Abraham prevented Hartmann from following the training analysis he had envisioned with him, and instead, he undertook a first analysis with Sándor Radó. In 1927, he published Grundlagen der Psychoanalyse (The Fundamentals of Psychoanalysis), foreshadowing the theoretical contributions to ego psychology he would later make. He also participated in the creation of a manual of medical psychology.

Hartmann was offered a full professorship in psychiatry by Adolf Meyer at Johns Hopkins University in the United States, in response to which Freud offered to analyze Hartmann free of charge if he would stay in Vienna. Hartmann chose to stay in Vienna and enter into analysis with Freud and was noted as a shining star amongst analysts of his generation, and a favorite pupil of Freud's.

In 1937, at the Vienna Psychoanalytic Society, he presented a study on the psychology of ego, a topic on which he would later expand on and which became the foundation for the theoretical movement known as ego-psychology.

In 1938, he left Austria with his family to escape the Nazis. Passing through Paris and then Switzerland, he arrived in New York in 1941 where he quickly became one of the foremost thinkers of the New York Psychoanalytic Society. He was joined by Ernst Kris and Rudolph Loewenstein, with whom he wrote many articles in what was known as the ego-psychology triumvirate.

In 1945, he founded an annual publication The Psychoanalytic Study of the Child with Ernst Kris and Anna Freud; while in the 1950s he became the president of the International Psychoanalytical Association (IPA) and after several years of his presidency, he received the honorary title of lifetime president.

Hartmann died in 1970 in Stony Point, New York.

Hartmann's mortal remains were buried at the cemetery of the 15th-century chapel of Fex-Crasta in the Val Fex, which is a part of the municipality of Sils im Engadin/Segl, a village in the Swiss canton of Graubünden. His wife Dorothea "Dora", née Karplus (1902–1974), who was a US-American, Austrian-born psychoanalyst as well, found her final resting place at his side. The plaque bears a quote from the roundelay in the novel Thus Spoke Zarathustra by German philosopher Friedrich Nietzsche, who spent some summer seasons during the 1880s in nearby Sils-Maria:

"Weh spricht vergeh / Doch alle Lust will Ewigkeit / Will tiefe, tiefe Ewigkeit" ["Woe saith: Hence! Go / But joys all want eternity / "Want deep profound eternity"]

== Writings and influence ==
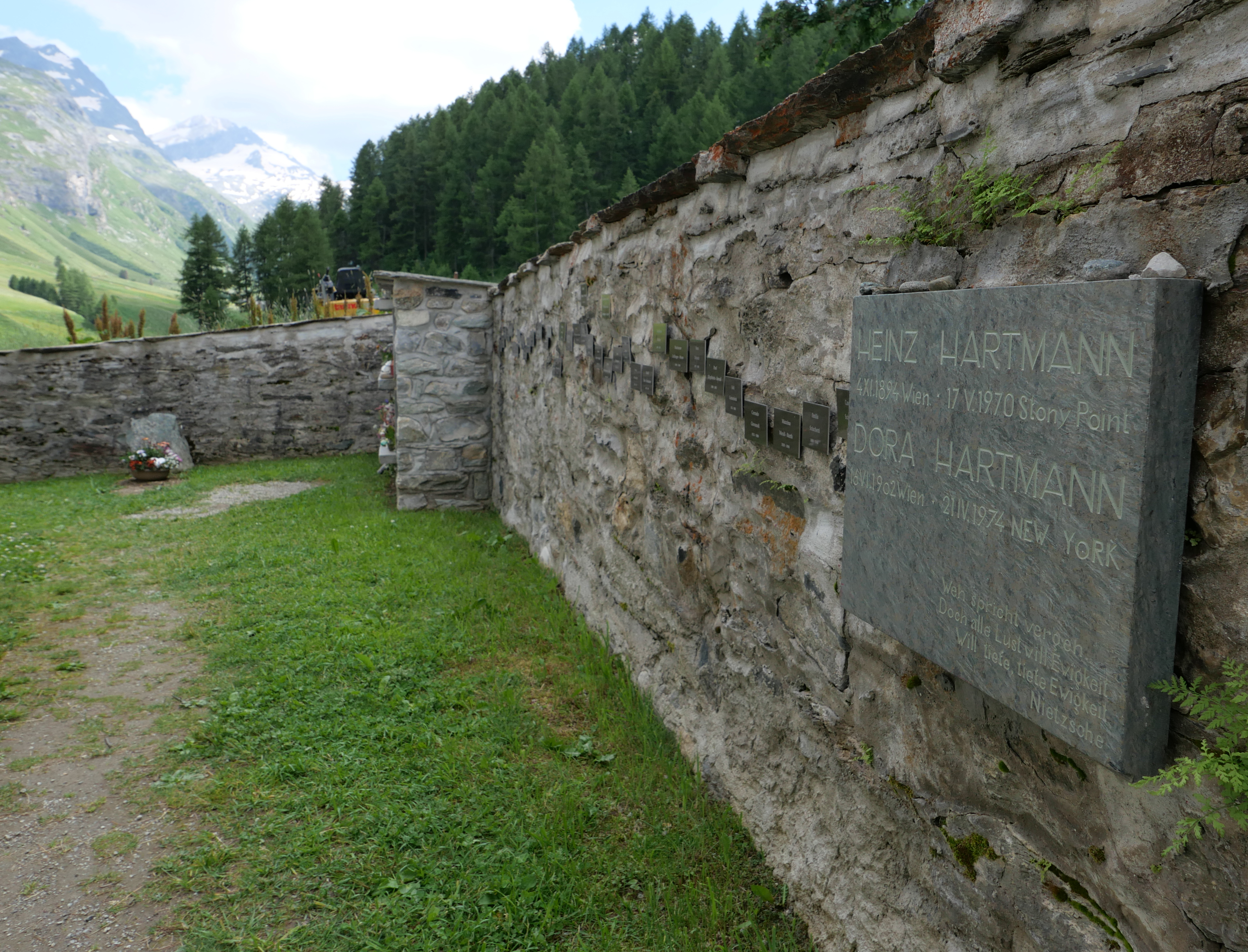
The grave in 2024 with the Fex Valley in the background

1922 saw the publication of Hartmann's first article, on depersonalization, which was followed by a number of studies on psychoses, neuroses, twins, etc.

In 1939, Hartmann, in what Otto Fenichel called "a very interesting paper, tried to show that adaptation has been studied too much from the point of view of mental conflict. He points out that there is also a 'sphere without conflict' " – something that would be repeatedly emphasized in ego-psychology. In the same year, in "Psychoanalysis and the Concept of Health", he made an impressive contribution to defining normality and health in psychoanalytic terms.

The subsequent development of ego-psychology within psychoanalysis, with its shift from instinct theory to the adaptive functions of the ego has been seen as allowing psychoanalysis and psychology to move closer to each other. Ego-psychology became in fact the dominant psychoanalytic force in the States for the next half-century or so, before object relations theory began to come to the fore. It formed the basis and starting-point for the self psychology of Heinz Kohut, for example, which both opposed and was rooted in Hartmann's theory of libido.

=== Criticism ===
Jacques Lacan focused much of his ire on what he called "'ego psychology' à la Hartmann...as a repudiation of psychoanalysis" – taking issue with its stress on the conflict-free zone of the ego and on adaptation to reality.

Nevertheless, some argue that ego psychology has a genuine Freudian ancestry, even if it cannot be seen as its sole heir.

== Select bibliography ==
- Heinz Hartmann, Ego Psychology and the Problem of Adaptation (1939)
- Heintz Hartmann, Essays on Ego Psychology (1964)

== See also ==
- Defence mechanisms
