= Albert J. Solnit =

American psychoanalyst

Albert Jay Solnit (August 26, 1919 – June 21, 2002) was an American psychoanalyst in the tradition of ego psychology He was an advocate of privileging children's needs in child custody cases. Solnit began teaching at the Yale School of Medicine in 1952 and was Sterling Professor of Psychiatry from 1970 to 1990. He was an editor of The Psychoanalytic Study of the Child from 1980 to 2002.

== Thematic interests ==
Solnit saw play as a signature expression of the child's personality - something he linked to Winnicott's concept of the transitional object.

Albert J Solnit also emphasised the importance in an ongoing life of constructing "a useful and self-respecting past...a crucial aspect of the individual's sense of free will is a knowledge of his own history that does not dominate".

In a series of books co-authored with Anna Freud and legal scholar Joseph Goldstein, he stressed the importance of the psychological needs of the child in custody law.

== Bibliography ==
=== Sole-authored works ===
- Memory as Preparation: Development and Psychoanalytic Perspectives. (1984) London: University College.

=== Co-authored volumes ===
- Senn MJE, Solnit AJ. Problems in child behavior and development (1970). Lea & Feibeger.
- Goldstein J, Freud A, Solnit AJ. Beyond the best interests of the child. Vol. 1. (1973) New York: Free Press.
- Goldstein J, Freud A, Solnit AJ. Before the best interests of the child. Vol. 2. (1979) New York: Free Press.
- Goldstein J, Freud A, Solnit AJ, Goldstein S. In the best interests of the child. Vol. 3. (1986) New York: Free Press.
- Goldstein S, Solnit AJ. Divorce and your child: Practical suggestions for parents (1985) New Haven: Yale University Press. ISBN 9780300028102
- Solnit AJ, Cohen DJ, Neubauer PB. The many meanings of play: A psychoanalytic perspective (1993) New Haven: Yale University Press. ISBN 9780300054385
- Solnit AJ, Nordhaus B, Lord R. When home is no haven: Child placement issues (1994). New Haven: Yale University Press. ISBN 9780300050912

=== Edited volumes ===
- Solnit AJ, Neubauer PB, Abrams S, Dowling AS. The Psychoanalytic Study of the Child (New Haven: Yale University Press) ISBN 9780300065794

== See also ==
- Daniel Offer
- Psychological trauma
