= The Psychoanalytic Study of the Child =

- The 2008 annual (volume 63) of the Psychoanalytic Study of the Child.
- Discipline: Child psychiatry
- Language: English
- Edited by: Claudia Lament; Paul M. Brinich; Rona Knight; Wendy Olesker

Publication details
- History: 1945–present
- Publisher: Taylor & Francis (United States)
- Frequency: Annual

Standard abbreviations
- ISO 4: Psychoanal. Study Child

Indexing
- ISSN: 0079-7308 (print); 2474-3356 (web)
- OCLC no.: 1307929

Links
- Journal homepage; Online access; Print archive; Online archive

The Psychoanalytic Study of the Child is an annual journal, published by Taylor & Francis, which contains scholarly articles on topics related to child psychiatry and psychoanalysis. The journal was founded in 1945 by Anna Freud, Heinz Hartmann, and Ernst Kris, and was previously published by Yale University Press.

Some notable editors and contributors are Ruth Selke Eissler, Albert J. Solnit, and Anna Freud. The publication has published several anthologies including, Psychoanalytic Assessment: The Diagnostic Profile. An Anthology of the Psychoanalytic Study of the Child (1977) and Physical Illness and Handicap in Childhood. An Anthology of The Psychoanalytic Study of the Child (1977).

== Abstracting and indexing ==
The Psychoanalytic Study of the Child is indexed and abstracted in:

- Scopus
- Social Sciences Citation Index
- Web of Science

== See also ==
- International Journal of Psychoanalysis
- Anna Freud Centre
- Yale Child Study Center
