= Ego psychology =

School of psychoanalysis

Ego psychology is a school of psychoanalysis rooted in Sigmund Freud's structural id-ego-superego model of the mind.

An individual interacts with the external world as well as responds to internal forces. Multiple psychoanalysts use a theoretical construct called the ego to explain how that is done through various ego functions. Adherents of ego psychology focus on the ego's normal and pathological development, its management of libidinal and aggressive impulses, and its adaptation to reality.

== History ==
=== Early conceptions of the ego ===
Sigmund Freud initially considered the ego to be a sense organ for perception of both external and internal stimuli. He thought of the ego as synonymous with consciousness and contrasted it with the repressed unconscious. In 1910, Freud emphasized the attention to detail when referencing psychoanalytical matters, while predicting his theory to become essential in regards to everyday tasks with the Swiss psychoanalyst, Oscar Pfister. By 1911, he referenced ego instincts for the first time in Formulations on the Two Principles of Mental Functioning and contrasted them with sexual instincts: ego instincts responded to the reality principle while sexual instincts obeyed the pleasure principle. He also introduced attention and memory as ego functions.

=== Freud's ego psychology ===
Freud later argued that not all unconscious phenomena can be attributed to the id, and that the ego has unconscious aspects as well. This posed a significant problem for his topographic theory, which he resolved in The Ego and the Id (1923).

In what came to be called the structural theory, the ego was now a formal component of a three-way system that also included the id and superego. The ego was still organized around conscious perceptual capacities, yet it now had unconscious features responsible for repression and other defensive operations. Freud's ego at this stage was relatively passive and weak; he described it as the helpless rider on the id's horse, more or less obliged to go where the id wished to go.

In Inhibitions, Symptoms, and Anxiety (1926), Freud revised his theory of anxiety as well as delineated a more robust ego. Freud argued that instinctual drives (id), moral and value judgments (superego), and requirements of external reality all make demands upon an individual. The ego mediates among conflicting pressures and creates the best compromise. Instead of being passive and reactive to the id, the ego was now a formidable counterweight to it, responsible for regulating id impulses, as well as integrating an individual's functioning into a coherent whole. The modifications made by Freud in Inhibitions, Symptoms, and Anxiety formed the basis of a psychoanalytic psychology interested in the nature and functions of the ego. This marked the transition of psychoanalysis from being primarily an id psychology, focused on the vicissitudes of the libidinal and aggressive drives as the determinants of both normal and psychopathological functioning, to a period in which the ego was accorded equal importance and was regarded as the prime shaper and modulator of behavior.

=== Systematization ===
Following Sigmund Freud, the psychoanalysts most responsible for the development of ego psychology, and its systematization as a formal school of psychoanalytic thought, were Anna Freud, Heinz Hartmann, and David Rapaport. Other important contributors included Ernst Kris, Rudolph Loewenstein, René Spitz, Margaret Mahler, Edith Jacobson, Paul Federn, and Erik Erikson.

==== Anna Freud ====
Anna Freud focused her attention on the ego's unconscious, defensive operations and introduced a number of theoretical and clinical considerations. In The Ego and the Mechanisms of Defense (1936), Anna Freud argued the ego was predisposed to supervise, regulate, and oppose the id through a variety of defenses. She described the defenses available to the ego, linked them to the stages of psychosexual development during which they originated, and identified various psychopathological compromise formations in which they were prominent. Clinically, Anna Freud emphasized that the psychoanalyst's attention should always be on the defensive functions of the ego, which could be observed in the manifest presentation of the patient's associations. The analyst needed to be attuned to the moment-by-moment process of what the patient talked about in order to identify, label, and explore defenses as they appeared. For Anna Freud, direct interpretation of repressed content was less important than understanding the ego's methods by which it kept things out of consciousness. Her work provided a bridge between Freud's structural theory and ego psychology.

==== Heinz Hartmann ====
Heinz Hartmann (1939/1958) believed the ego included innate capacities that facilitated an individual's ability to adapt to their environment. These included perception, attention, memory, concentration, motor coordination, and language. Under normal conditions, which Hartmann called "an average expectable environment," these capacities developed into ego functions with autonomy from the libidinal and aggressive drives; that is, they were not products of frustration and conflict as Freud (1911) believed. Hartmann recognized, however, that conflicts were part of the human condition and that certain ego functions may become conflicted by aggressive and libidinal impulses, as witnessed by conversion disorders (e.g., glove paralysis), speech impediments, eating disorders, and attention-deficit disorder.

A focus on ego functions and how an individual adapts to their environment led Hartmann to create both a general psychology and a clinical instrument with which an analyst could evaluate an individual's functioning and formulate appropriate therapeutic interventions. Hartmann's propositions imply that the task of the ego psychologist was to neutralize conflicted impulses and expand the conflict-free spheres of ego functions. Through such effects, Hartmann believed, psychoanalysis facilitated an individual's adaptation to his or her environment. He claimed, however, that his aim was to understand the mutual regulation of the ego and environment rather than to promote adjustment of the ego to the environment; additionally, he proposed that diminishing conflict in an individual's ego would help him or her to respond actively to, and shape rather than passively react to, the environment.

Mitchell and Black (1995) wrote: "Hartmann powerfully affected the course of psychoanalysis, opening up a crucial investigation of the key processes and vicissitudes of normal development. Hartmann's contributions broadened the scope of psychoanalytic concerns, from psychopathology to general human development, and from an isolated, self-contained treatment method to a sweeping intellectual discipline among other disciplines" (p. 35).

==== David Rapaport ====
David Rapaport played a prominent role in the development of ego psychology, and his work likely represented its apex. In the influential monograph The Structure of Psychoanalytic Theory (1960), Rappaport organized ego psychology into an integrated, systematic, and hierarchical theory capable of generating empirically testable hypotheses. He proposed that psychoanalytic theory—as expressed through the principles of ego psychology—was a biologically based general psychology that could explain the entire range of human behavior. For Rapaport, this endeavor was fully consistent with Freud's attempts to do the same (e.g., Freud's studies of dreams, jokes, and the "psychopathology of everyday life".)

==== Other contributors ====
While Hartmann was the principal architect of ego psychology, he collaborated closely with Ernst Kris and Rudolph Loewenstein.

Subsequent psychoanalysts interested in ego psychology emphasized the importance of early-childhood experiences and socio-cultural influences on ego development. René Spitz (1965), Margaret Mahler (1968), Edith Jacobson (1964), and Erik Erikson studied infant and child behavior, and their observations were integrated into ego psychology. Their observational and empirical research described and explained early attachment issues, successful and faulty ego development, and psychological development through interpersonal interactions.

Spitz identified the importance of mother-infant nonverbal emotional reciprocity; Mahler refined the traditional psychosexual developmental phases by adding the separation-individuation process; and Jacobson emphasized how libidinal and aggressive impulses unfolded within the context of early relationships and environmental factors. Finally, Erik Erikson provided a bold reformulation of Freud's biologic, epigenetic psychosexual theory through his explorations of socio-cultural influences on ego development. For Erikson, an individual was pushed by his or her own biological urges and pulled by socio-cultural forces.

=== Decline ===
In the United States, ego psychology was the predominant psychoanalytic approach from the 1940s through the 1960s. Initially, this was due to the influx of European psychoanalysts, including prominent ego psychologists like Hartmann, Kris, and Loewenstein, during and after World War II. These European analysts settled throughout the United States and trained the next generation of American psychoanalysts.

By the 1970s, several challenges to the philosophical, theoretical, and clinical tenets of ego psychology emerged. The most prominent of which were: a "rebellion" led by Rapaport's protégés (George Klein, Robert Holt, Roy Schafer, and Merton Gill); object relations theory; and self psychology.

== Contemporary ==
=== Modern conflict theory ===
Charles Brenner (1982) attempted to revive ego psychology with a concise and incisive articulation of the fundamental focus of psychoanalysis: intrapsychic conflict and the resulting compromise formations. Over time, Brenner (2002) tried to develop a more clinically based theory, what came to be called "modern conflict theory." He distanced himself from the formal components of the structural theory and its metapsychological assumptions, and focused entirely on compromise formations.

Heinz Kohut developed self psychology, a theoretical and therapeutic model related to ego psychology, in the late 1960s. Self psychology focuses on the mental model of the self as important in pathologies. (Note: "Moreover, Kohut sharply departed from the works of Freud and subsequent ego psychologists by stressing that psychopathology arose from deficits in the self rather than from internal conflict")

== Ego functions ==
- Reality testing: The ego's capacity to distinguish what is occurring in one's own mind from what is occurring in the external world. It is perhaps the single most important ego function because negotiating with the outside world requires accurately perceiving and understanding stimuli. Reality testing is often subject to temporary, mild distortion or deterioration under stressful conditions. Such impairment can result in temporary delusions and hallucination and is generally selective, clustering along specific, psychodynamic lines. Chronic deficiencies suggest either psychotic or organic interference.
- Impulse control: The ability to manage aggressive and/or libidinal wishes without immediate discharge through behavior or symptoms. Problems with impulse control are common; for example: road rage; sexual promiscuity; excessive drug and alcohol use; and binge eating.
- Affect regulation: The ability to modulate feelings without being overwhelmed.
- Judgment: The capacity to act responsibly. This process includes identifying possible courses of action, anticipating and evaluating likely consequences, and making decisions as to what is appropriate in certain circumstances.
- Object relations: The capacity for mutually satisfying relationship. The individual can perceive himself and others as whole objects with three dimensional qualities.
- Thought processes: The ability to have logical, coherent, and abstract thoughts. In stressful situations, thought processes can become disorganized. The presence of chronic or severe problems in conceptual thinking is frequently associated with schizophrenia and manic episodes.
- Defensive functioning: A defense is an unconscious attempt to protect the individual from some powerful, identity-threatening feeling. Initial defenses develop in infancy and involve the boundary between the self and the outer world; they are considered primitive defenses and include projection, denial, and splitting. As the child grows up, more sophisticated defenses that deal with internal boundaries such as those between ego and super ego or the id develop; these defenses include repression, regression, displacement, and reaction formation. All adults have, and use, primitive defenses, but most people also have more mature ways of coping with reality and anxiety.
- Synthesis: The synthetic function is the ego's capacity to organize and unify other functions within the personality. It enables the individual to think, feel, and act in a coherent manner. It includes the capacity to integrate potentially contradictory experiences, ideas, and feelings; for example, a child loves his or her mother yet also has angry feelings toward her at times. The ability to synthesize these feelings is a pivotal developmental achievement.

Reality testing involves the individual's capacity to understand and accept both physical and social reality as it is consensually defined within a given culture or cultural subgroup. In large measure, the function hinges on the individual's capacity to distinguish between her own wishes or fears (internal reality) and events that occur in the real world (external reality). The ability to make distinctions that are consensually validated determines the ego's capacity to distinguish and mediate between personal expectations, on the one hand, and social expectations or laws of nature on the other. Individuals vary considerably in how they manage this function. When the function is seriously compromised, individuals may withdraw from contact with reality for extended periods of time. This degree of withdrawal is most frequently seen in psychotic conditions. Most times, however, the function is mildly or moderately compromised for a limited period of time, with far less drastic consequences' (Berzoff, 2011).

Judgment involves the capacity to reach "reasonable" conclusions about what is and what is not "appropriate" behavior. Typically, arriving at a "reasonable" conclusion involves the following steps: (1) correlating wishes, feeling states, and memories about prior life experiences with current circumstances; (2) evaluating current circumstances in the context of social expectations and laws of nature (e.g., it is not possible to transport oneself instantly out of an embarrassing situation, no matter how much one wishes to do so); and (3) drawing realistic conclusions about the likely consequences of different possible courses of action. As the definition suggests, judgment is closely related to reality testing, and the two functions are usually evaluated in tandem (Berzoff, 2011).

Modulating and controlling impulses is based on the capacity to hold sexual and aggressive feelings in check without acting on them until the ego has evaluated whether they meet the individual's own moral standards and are acceptable in terms of social norms. Adequate functioning in this area depends on the individual's capacity to tolerate frustration, to delay gratification, and to tolerate anxiety without immediately acting to ameliorate it. Impulse control also depends on the ability to exercise appropriate judgment in situations where the individual is strongly motivated to seek relief from psychological tension and/or to pursue some pleasurable activity (sex, power, fame, money, etc.). Problems in modulation may involve either too little or too much control over impulses (Berzoff, 2011).

Modulation of affect The ego performs this function by preventing painful or unacceptable emotional reactions from entering conscious awareness, or by managing the expression of such feelings in ways that do not disrupt either emotional equilibrium or social relationships. To adequately perform this function, the ego constantly monitors the source, intensity, and direction of feeling states, as well as the people toward whom feelings will be directed. Monitoring determines whether such states will be acknowledged or expressed and, if so, in what form. The basic principle to remember in evaluating how well the ego manages this function is that affect modulation may be problematic because of too much or too little expression. As an integral part of the monitoring process, the ego evaluates the type of expression that is most congruent with established social norms. For example, in white American culture it is assumed that individuals will contain themselves and maintain a high level of personal/vocational functioning except in extremely traumatic situations such as death of a family member, very serious illness or terrible accident. This standard is not necessarily the norm in other cultures (Berzhoff, Flanagan, & Hertz, 2011).

Object relations involves the ability to form and maintain coherent representations of others and of the self. The concept refers not only to the people one interacts with in the external world but also to significant others who are remembered and represented within the mind. Adequate functioning implies the ability to maintain a basically positive view of the other, even when one feels disappointed, frustrated, or angered by the other's behavior. Disturbances in object relations may manifest themselves through an inability to fall in love, emotional coldness, lack of interest in or withdrawal from interactions with others, intense dependency, and/or an excessive need to control relationships (Berzhoff, Flanagan, & Hertz, 2011).

Self-esteem regulation involves the capacity to maintain a steady and reasonable level of positive self-regard in the face of distressing or frustrating external events. Painful affective states, including anxiety, depression, shame, and guilt, as well as exhilarating emotions such as triumph, glee, and ecstasy may also undermine self-esteem. Generally speaking, in dominant American culture a measured expression of both pain and pleasure is expressed; excess in either direction is a cause for concern. White Western culture tends to assume that individuals will maintain a consistent and steadily level of self-esteem, regardless of external events or internally generated feeling states (Berzhoff, Flanagan, & Hertz, 2011).

Mastery when conceptualized as an ego function, mastery reflects the epigenetic view that individuals achieve more advanced levels of ego organization by mastering successive developmental challenges. Each stage of psychosexual development (oral, anal, phallic, genital) presents a particular challenge that must be adequately addressed before the individual can move on to the next higher stage. By mastering stage-specific challenges, the ego gains strength in relations to the other structures of the mind and thereby becomes more effective in organizing and synthesizing mental processes. Freud expressed this principle in his statement, "Where id was, shall ego be." An undeveloped capacity for mastery can be seen, for example, in infants who have not been adequately nourished, stimulated, and protected during the first year of life, in the oral stage of development. When they enter the anal stage, such infants are not well prepared to learn socially acceptable behavior or to control the pleasure they derive from defecating at will. As a result, some of them will experience delays in achieving bowel control and will have difficulty in controlling temper tantrums, while others will sink into a passive, joyless compliance with parental demands that compromises their ability to explore, learn, and become physically competent. Conversely, infants who have been well gratified and adequately stimulated during the oral stage enter the anal stage feeling relatively secure and confident. For the most part, they cooperate in curbing their anal desires, and are eager to win parental approval for doing so. In addition, they are physically active, free to learn and eager to explore. As they gain confidence in their increasingly autonomous physical and mental abilities, they also learn to follow the rules their parents establish and, in doing so, with parental approval. As they master the specific tasks related to the anal stage, they are well prepared to move on to the next stage of development and the next set of challenges. When adults have problems with mastery, they usually enact them in derivative or symbolic ways (Berzhoff, Flanagan, & Hertz, 2011).

== Conflict, defense and resistance analysis ==
According to Freud's structural theory, an individual's libidinal and aggressive impulses are continuously in conflict with their own conscience as well as with the limits imposed by reality. In certain circumstances, these conflicts may lead to neurotic symptoms. Thus, the goal of psychoanalytic treatment is to establish a balance between bodily needs, psychological wants, one's own conscience, and social constraints. Ego psychologists argue that the conflict is best addressed by the psychological agency that has the closest relationship to consciousness, unconsciousness, and reality: the ego.

The clinical technique most commonly associated with ego psychology is defense analysis. Through clarifying, confronting, and interpreting the typical defense mechanisms a patient uses, ego psychologists hope to help the patient gain control over these mechanisms.

== Cultural influences ==
- The classical scholar E. R. Dodds used ego psychology as the framework for his influential study The Greeks and the Irrational (1951).
- The Sterbas relied on Hartmann's conflict-free sphere to help explain the contradictions they found in Beethoven's character in Beethoven and His Nephew (1954).

== Criticisms ==
Many authors have criticized Hartmann's conception of a conflict-free sphere of ego functioning as both incoherent and inconsistent with Freud's vision of psychoanalysis as a science of mental conflict. Freud believed that the ego itself takes shape as a result of the conflict between the id and the external world. The ego, therefore, is inherently a conflicting formation in the mind. To state, as Hartmann did, that the ego contains a conflict-free sphere may not be consistent with key propositions of Freud's structural theory.

Ego psychology, and 'Anna-Freudianism', were together seen by Kleinians as maintaining a conformist, adaptative version of psychoanalysis inconsistent with Freud's own views. Hartmann claimed, however, that his aim was to understand the mutual regulation of the ego and environment rather than to promote adjustment of the ego to the environment. Furthermore, an individual with a less-conflicted ego would be better able to actively respond and shape, rather than passively react to, his or her environment.

Jacques Lacan was if anything still more opposed to ego psychology, using his concept of the Imaginary to stress the role of identifications in building up the ego in the first place. Lacan saw in the "non-conflictual sphere...a down-at-heel mirage that had already been rejected as untenable by the most academic psychology of introspection'.

== See also ==
- Anna Freud Centre
- Jacob Arlow
- Joseph J. Sandler
- Psychoanalytic Study of the Child
