= New York Psychoanalytic Society & Institute =

Oldest psychoanalytic organization in the United States

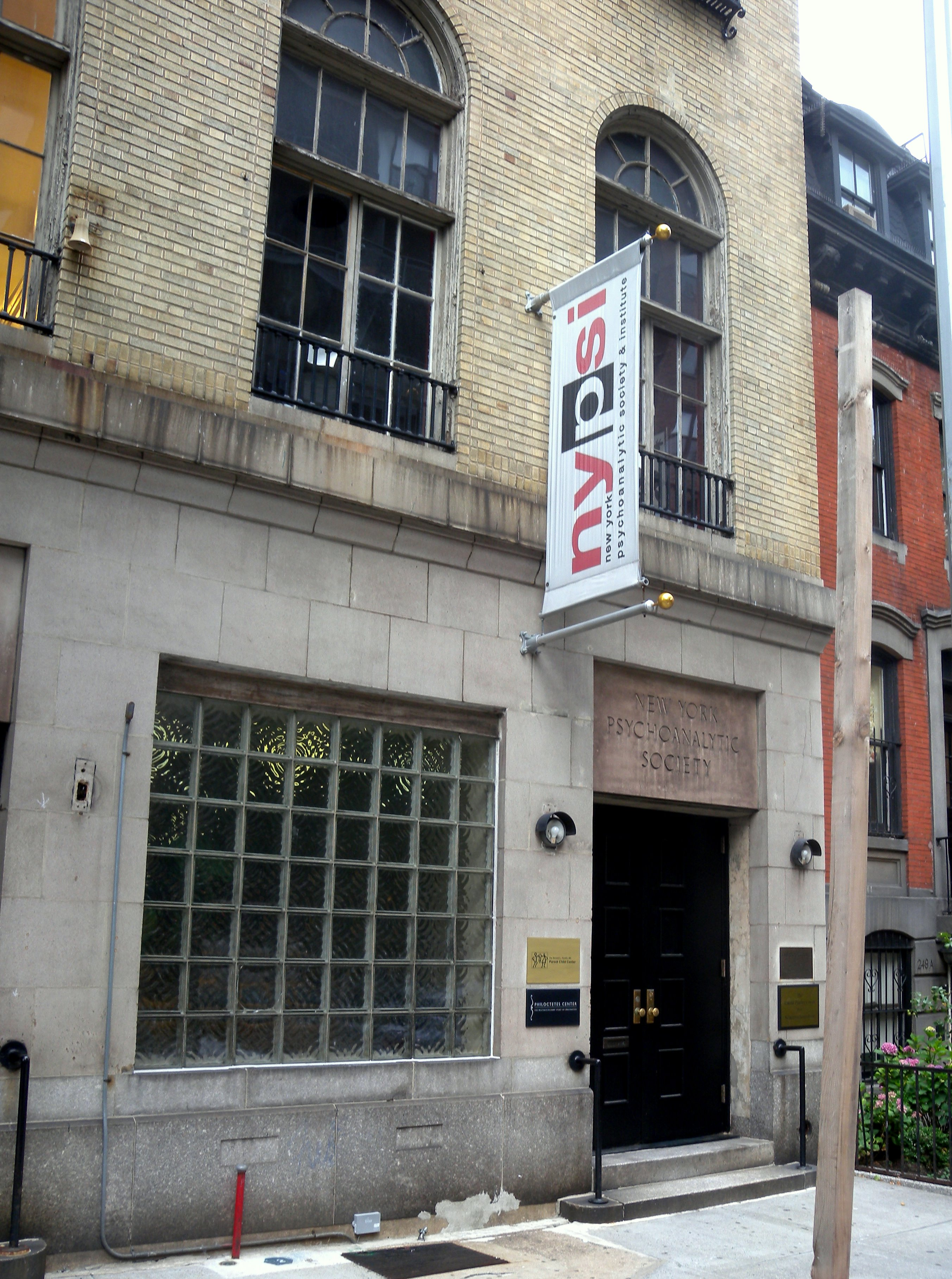
247 East 82nd Street, Manhattan

The New York Psychoanalytic Society and Institute (founded in 1911 by Abraham Brill) is the oldest psychoanalytic organization in the United States.

== Members ==
The charter members were: Louis Edward Bisch, Brill, Horace Westlake Frink, Frederick James Farnell, William C. Garvin, August Hoch, Morris J. Karpas, George H. Kirby, Clarence P. Oberndorf, Bronislaw Onuf, Ernest Marsh Poate, Charles Ricksher, Jacob Rosenbloom, Edward W. Scripture and Samuel A. Tannenbaum.

The institute was a professional home to some of the leaders in psychoanalytic education and treatment, such as Margaret Mahler, Ernst Kris, Kurt R. Eissler, Heinz Hartmann, Abram Kardiner, Rudolph Loewenstein, Charles Brenner, Thaddeus Ames, Robert C. Bak, and Otto Kernberg.
