= Anna Freud =

Austrian–British psychoanalyst (1895–1982)

Anna Freud CBE
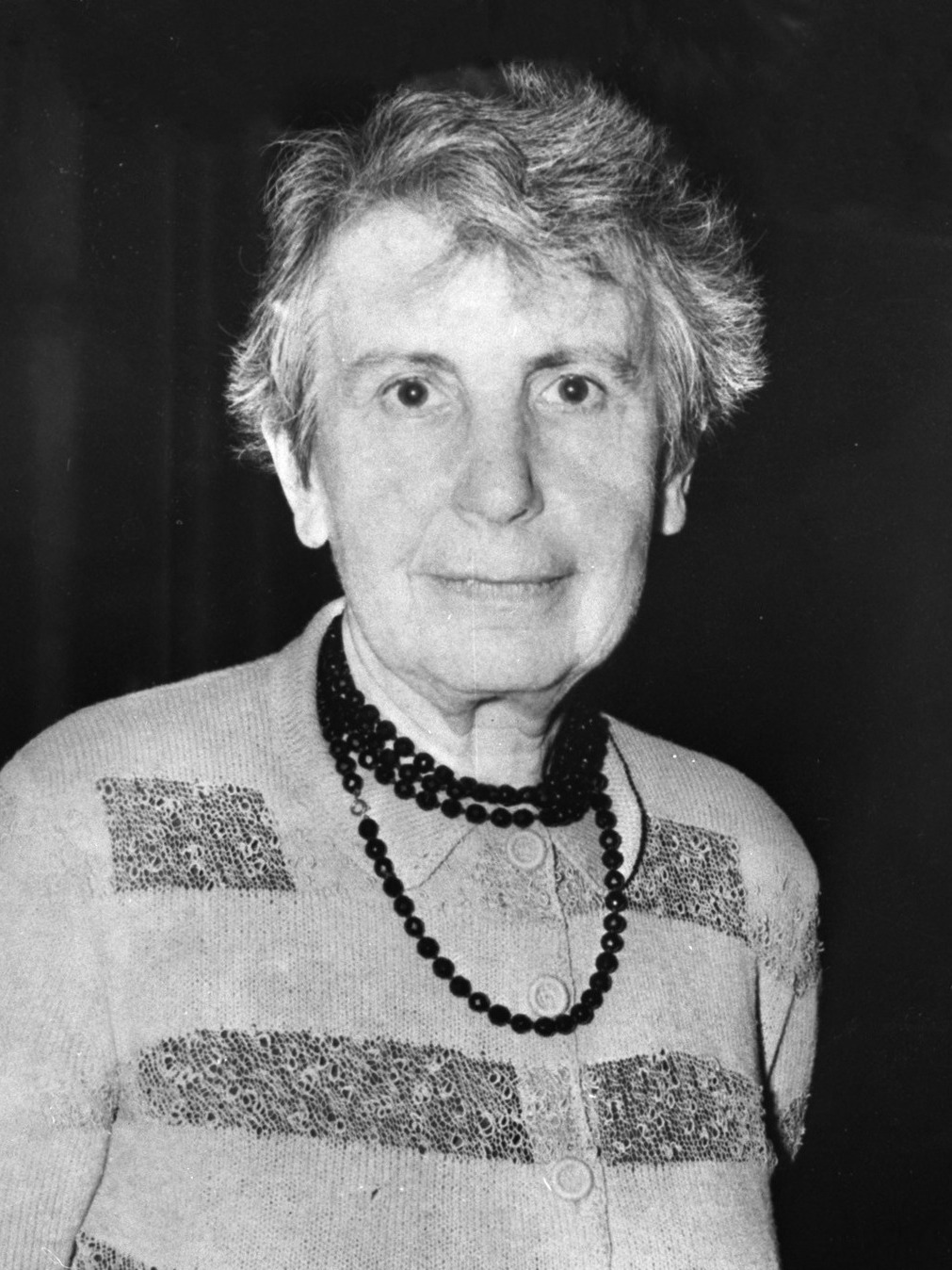
- Freud in 1957
- Born: 3 December 1895; Vienna, Austria-Hungary
- Died: 9 October 1982 (aged 86); London, England
- Resting place: Golders Green Crematorium
- Citizenship: 1895–1946: Austria; 1946–1982: United Kingdom
- Education: Cottage Lyceum, Vienna
- Occupation: Psychoanalyst
- Years active: 1923–1982
- Organization(s): Hampstead Child Therapy Course and Clinic in 1952 (later renamed the Anna Freud National Centre for Children and Families)
- Known for: Child analysis, ego psychology
- Notable work: The Ego and the Mechanism of Defence; Normality and Pathology in Childhood
- Partner: Dorothy Burlingham
- Parents: Sigmund Freud (father); Martha Bernays (mother)
- Relatives: Freud family
- Awards: Order of the British Empire

Anna Freud CBE (/frɔɪd/ FROYD; Austrian German: [ˈana ˈfrɔʏd]; 3 December 1895 – 9 October 1982) was a British psychoanalyst of Austrian Jewish descent. She was born in Vienna, the sixth and youngest child of Sigmund Freud and Martha Bernays. She followed the path of her father and contributed to the field of psychoanalysis. Alongside Hermine Hug-Hellmuth and Melanie Klein, she may be considered the founder of psychoanalytic child psychology.

Compared to her father, her work emphasized the importance of the ego and its normal "developmental lines" as well as incorporating a distinctive emphasis on collaborative work across a range of analytical and observational contexts.

After the Freud family were forced to leave Vienna in 1938 with the advent of the Nazi regime in Austria, she resumed her psychoanalytic practice and her pioneering work in child psychoanalysis in London, establishing the Hampstead Child Therapy Course and Clinic in 1952 (later renamed the Anna Freud National Centre for Children and Families) as a centre for therapy, training and research work.

== Vienna years ==
Anna Freud was born in Vienna, Austria-Hungary, on 3 December 1895. She was the youngest daughter of Sigmund Freud and Martha Bernays. She grew up in "comfortable bourgeois circumstances." Anna Freud appears to have had a comparatively unhappy childhood, in which she "never made a close or pleasurable relationship with her mother, and was instead nurtured by their Catholic nurse Josephine". She found it particularly difficult to get along with her eldest sister, Sophie; "the two young Freuds developed their version of a common sisterly division of territories, 'beauty' and 'brains', and their father once spoke of her "age-old jealousy of Sophie." As well as this rivalry between the two sisters, Anna had become "a somewhat troubled youngster who complained to her father in candid letters how all sorts of unreasonable thoughts and feelings plagued her". According to Young-Bruehl, Anna's communications imply a persistent, emotionally-caused cognitive disturbance, and perhaps a mild eating disorder. She was repeatedly sent to health farms for "thorough rest, salutary walks, and some extra pounds to fill out her all-too-slender shape".

The close relationship between Anna and her father was different from the rest of her family. She was a lively child with a reputation for mischief. Freud wrote to his friend Wilhelm Fliess in 1899: "Anna has become downright beautiful through naughtiness." In adolescence, she took a precocious interest in her father's work and was allowed to sit in on the meetings of the newly established Vienna Psychoanalytical Society, which Freud convened at his home.

Enrolled at the Cottage Lyceum, a secondary school for girls in Vienna, Anna made good progress in most subjects. The steady flow of foreign visitors to the Freud household inspired Anna to emulate her father by becoming proficient in different languages, and she soon mastered English and French and acquired some basic Italian. The positive experience she had at the Lyceum led to her initial choice of teaching as a career. After she left the Lyceum in 1912, she took an extended vacation over the winter months in Italy. This proved to be, for a period, a time of self-doubt, anxiety, and uncertainty about her future. She shared these concerns in correspondence with her father, whose writings she had begun reading. In response, he provided reassurance, and in the spring of 1913, he joined her for a tour of Verona, Venice, and Trieste.

A visit to Britain in the autumn of 1914, chaperoned by her father's colleague Ernest Jones, became of concern to Freud when he learned of the latter's romantic interest. His advice to Jones, in a letter of 22 July 1914, was that his daughter "does not claim to be treated as a woman, being still far away from sexual longings and rather refusing man. There is an outspoken understanding between me and her that she should not consider marriage or the preliminaries before she gets two or three years older".

=== Teacher ===
In 1914, she passed her teaching examination and began work as a teaching apprentice at her old school, the Cottage Lyceum. From 1915 to 1917, she worked as a teaching apprentice for third, fourth, and fifth graders. For the school year 1917–18, she began "her first venture as Klassenlehrerin (head teacher) for the second grade". For her performance during the school years 1915–18, she was praised for her "gift for teaching" by her superior, Salka Goldman, and invited to stay on with a regular four-year contract starting in the fall of 1918.

Having contracted tuberculosis during 1918, and thereafter experiencing multiple episodes of illness, she resigned her teaching post in 1920.

=== Psychoanalysis ===
With the encouragement and assistance of her father, she pursued her exploration of psychoanalytic literature, and in the summer of 1915, she undertook her first translation work for the Vienna Psychoanalytical Society, translating papers by James Jackson Putnam (into German) and Hermine Hug-Hellmuth (into English). During 1916 and 1917, she attended the lectures on psychoanalysis her father gave at the University of Vienna. By 1918, she had gained his support to pursue training in psychoanalysis, and she went into analysis with him in October of that year.

As well as in the periods of analysis she had with her father (from 1918 to 1921 and from 1924 to 1929), their filial bond became further strengthened after Freud was diagnosed with cancer of the jaw in 1923, for which he would need numerous operations and the long-term nursing assistance that Anna provided. She also acted as his secretary and spokesperson, notably at the bi-annual congresses of the International Psychoanalytical Association, which Freud was unable to attend after 1922.

=== Lou Andreas-Salome ===
At the outset of her psychoanalytic practice, Anna found an important friend and mentor in the person of her father's friend and colleague, Lou Andreas-Salome. After she came to stay with the Freuds in Vienna in 1921, they began a series of consultations and discussions that continued both in Vienna and in visits Anna made to Salome's home in Germany. As a result of the relationship, Anna gained confidence both as a theorist and as a practitioner.

=== Early psychoanalytic work ===
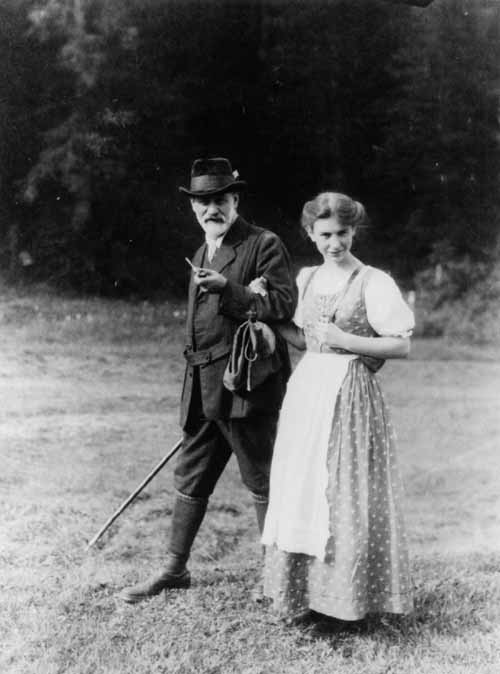
Anna Freud with her father Sigmund Freud in 1913

In 1922, Anna Freud presented her paper "Beating Fantasies and Daydreams" to the Vienna Psychoanalytical Society and became a member of the society. According to Ruth Menahem, the case presented, that of a 15-year-old girl, is in fact her own, since at that time she had no patients yet. In 1923, she began her own psychoanalytical practice with children and by 1925 she was teaching at the Vienna Psychoanalytic Training Institute on the technique of child analysis, her approach to which she set out in her first book, An Introduction to the Technique of Child Analysis, published in 1927.

Among the first children Anna Freud took into analysis were those of Dorothy Burlingham. In 1925, Burlingham, heiress to the Tiffany luxury jewellery retailer, had arrived in Vienna from New York with her four children. She entered analysis first with Theodore Reik and then, with a view to training in child analysis, with Sigmund Freud himself. Anna and Dorothy soon developed "intimate relations that closely resembled those of lesbians", though Anna "categorically denied the existence of a sexual relationship". After the Burlinghams moved into the same apartment block as the Freuds in 1929, Anna became, in effect, the children's step-parent. In 1930, Anna and Dorothy bought a cottage together.

In 1927, Anna Freud and Dorothy Burlingham set up a new school in collaboration with a family friend, Eva Rosenfeld, who ran a foster care home in the Hietzing district of Vienna. Rosenfeld provided the space on the grounds of her house, and Burlingham funded the building and equipping of the premises. The objective was to provide a psychoanalytically informed education, and Anna contributed to the teaching. Most pupils were either in analysis themselves, or were children of analysands or practitioners. Peter Blos and Erik Erikson joined the staff of the Hietzing school at the beginning of their psychoanalytic careers, Erikson entering into a training analysis with Anna. The school closed in 1932.

Anna's first clinical case was that of her nephew Ernst, the eldest of the two sons of Sophie and Max Halberstadt. Sophie, Anna's elder sister, had died of influenza in 1920 at her Hamburg home. Heinz (known as Heinele), aged two, was adopted in an informal arrangement by Anna's elder sister, Mathilde, and her husband Robert Hollitscher. Anna became heavily involved in the care of eight-year-old Ernst and also considered adoption. She was dissuaded by her father over concerns for his wife's health.

Anna made regular trips to Hamburg for analytical work with Ernst who was in the care of his father's extended family. She also arranged Ernst's transfer to a school more appropriate to his needs, provided respite for her brother-in-law's family and arranged for him to join the Freud-Burlingham extended family for their summer holidays. Eventually, in 1928, Anna persuaded the parties concerned that a permanent move to Vienna was in Ernst's best interests, not least because he could resume analysis with her on a more regular basis. Ernst went into the foster care of Eva Rosenfeld, attended the Hietzing school and became part of the Freud-Burlingham extended family. In 1930, he spent a year at Berggasse 19, where the Freuds and Burlinghams had apartments, staying with the Burlinghams.

In 1937, Freud and Burlingham launched a new project, establishing a nursery for children under the age of two. The aim was to meet the social needs of children from impoverished families and to enhance psychoanalytic research into early childhood development. Funding was provided by Edith Jackson, a wealthy American analysand of Anna's father who had also been trained in child analysis by Anna at the Vienna Insitiute. Though the Jackson Nursery was short-lived, with the Anschluss imminent, the systematic record keeping and reporting provided important models for Anna's future work with nursery children.

From 1925 until 1934, Anna was the Secretary of the International Psychoanalytical Association while she continued her child analysis practice and contributed to seminars and conferences on the subject. In 1935, she became director of the Vienna Psychoanalytical Training Institute and the following year she published her influential study of the "ways and means by which the ego wards off depression, displeasure and anxiety", The Ego and the Mechanisms of Defence. It became a founding work of ego psychology and established Freud's reputation as a pioneering theoretician.

== London years ==
In 1938, following the Anschluss, in which Nazi Germany occupied Austria, Anna was taken to Gestapo headquarters in Vienna for questioning on the activities of the International Psychoanalytical Association. Unknown to her father, she and her brother Martin had obtained Veronal from Max Schur, the family doctor, in sufficient quantities to die of suicide if faced with torture or internment. However, she survived her interrogation ordeal and returned to the family home.

After her father had reluctantly accepted the urgent need to leave Vienna, she set about organizing the complex immigration process for the family in liaison with Ernest Jones, the then President of the International Psychoanalytical Association, who secured the immigration permits that eventually led to the family establishing their new home in London at 20 Maresfield Gardens, Hampstead.

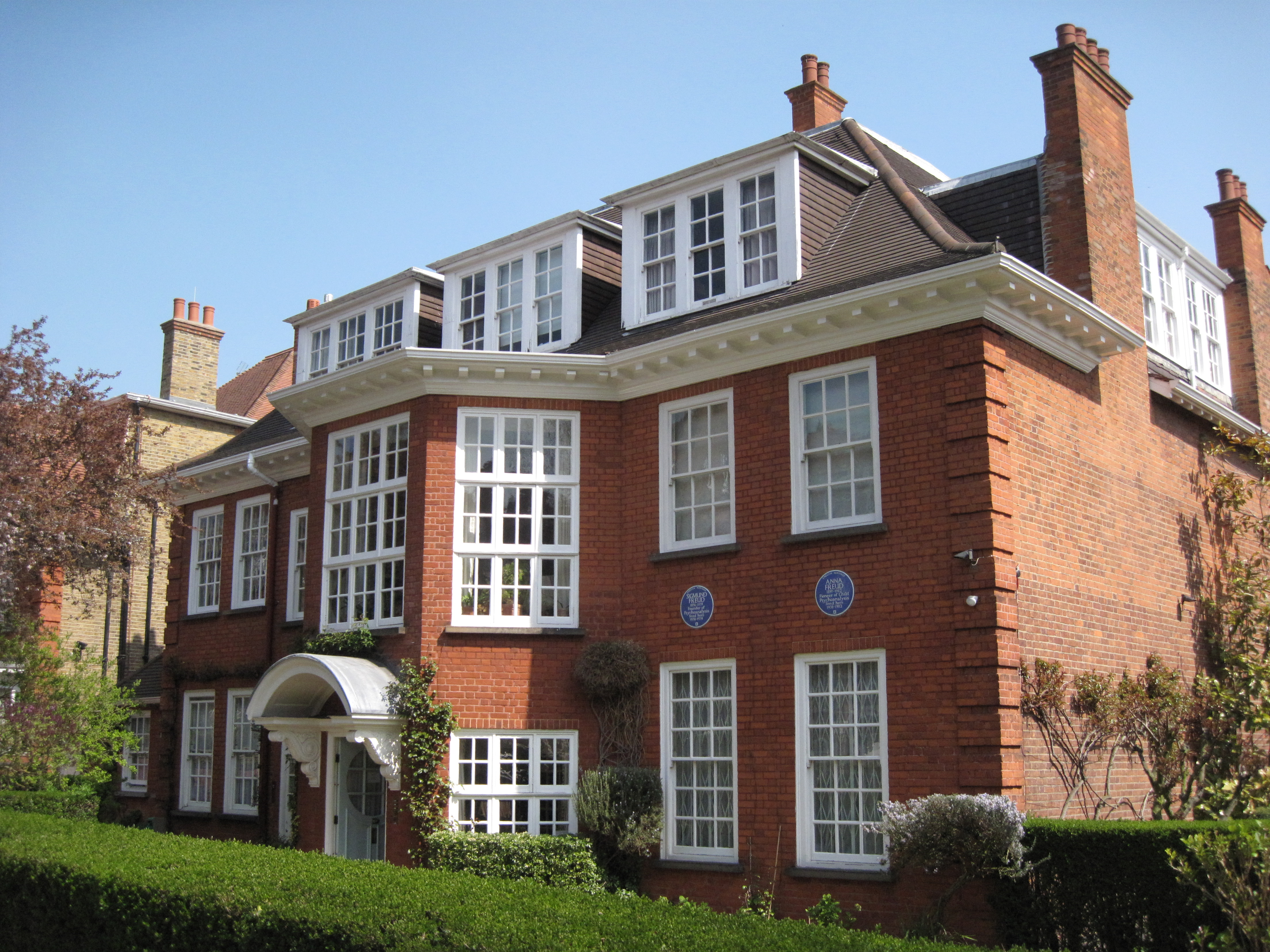
Anna Freud's London home, now dedicated to the life and work of her father as the Freud Museum

In January 1941, Freud and Burlingham collaborated in establishing the Hampstead War Nursery for children whose lives had been disrupted by the war. Premises were acquired in Hampstead, North London and in Essex to provide education and residential care with mothers encouraged to visit as often as practicable. Many for the staff were recruited from the exiled Austro-German diaspora. Lectures and seminars on psychoanalytic theory and practice were regular features of staff training.

Freud and Burlingham went on to publish a series of observational studies on child development based on the work of the Nursery with a focus on the impact of stress on children and their capacity to find substitute affections among peers in the absence of their parents. The Bulldog Banks Home, run on similar lines to the Nursery, was established after the war for a group of children who had survived the concentration camps. Building on and developing their war-time work with children, Freud and Burlingham established the Hampstead Child Therapy Course and Clinic (now the Anna Freud National Centre for Children and Families) in 1952 as a centre for therapy, training and research work.

During the war years, the hostility between Anna Freud and Melanie Klein and their respective followers in the British Psychoanalytic Society (BPS) grew more intense. Their disagreements, which dated back to the 1920s, centered around the theory of the genesis of the super-ego and the consequent clinical approach to the pre-Oedipal child; Klein argued for play as an equivalent to free association in adult analyses. Anna Freud opposed any such equivalence, proposing an educative intervention with the child until an appropriate level of ego development was reached at the Oedipal stage. Klein held this to be a collusive inhibition of analytical work with the child.

To avoid a terminal split in the BPS, Ernest Jones, its president, chaired a number of "extraordinary business meetings" with the aim of defusing the conflict, and these continued during the war years. The meetings, which became known as the Controversial Discussions, were established on a more regular basis from 1942. In 1944, there finally emerged a compromise agreement which established parallel training courses, providing options to satisfy the concerns of the rival groups that had formed which by then, in addition to the followers of Freud and Klein, included a non-aligned group of Middle or Independent Group analysts. It was agreed further that all the key policy-making committees of the BPS should have representatives from the three groups.

In 1945, along with her American colleagues Ruth Selke Eissler, Heinz Hartmann, and Ernst Kriss, she helped found the journal The Psychoanalytic Study of the Child, and served on its editorial board. It became the journal of choice for much of her published work.

From the 1950s until the end of her life, Freud travelled regularly to the United States to lecture, teach and visit friends. During the 1970s, she was concerned with the problems of emotionally deprived and socially disadvantaged children, and she studied deviations and delays in development. At Yale Law School, she taught seminars on crime and the family: this led to a transatlantic collaboration with Joseph Goldstein and Albert J. Solnit on children's needs and the law, published in three volumes as Beyond the Best Interests of the Child (1973), Before the Best Interests of the Child (1979), and In the Best Interests of the Child (1986).

Freud also used her visits to raise funds for the expanding work of the Hampstead Clinic and was able to secure funding from the National Institute of Mental Health. The Clinic was also the beneficiary of a substantial bequest from the estate of Marilyn Monroe who had left money to her New York analyst, Marianne Kris, with the instruction to allocate it to support psychological clinical and research work through a charity of her choice.

The 1970s were also a time of emotional stress for Freud as she endured a number of bereavements involving family members and close colleagues. Her favourite brother, Ernst, died in April 1970 while she was in America. In the following months she lost two of her American cousins, Henry Freud and Rosie Waldinger, and colleagues Heinz Hartmann and Max Schur. She had further distress following the deaths of her partner Dorothy Burlingham's eldest son and daughter, both of whom had had extensive period of analysis with her as children in Vienna and as adults in London. Robert Burlingham died in February 1970 of heart disease after a long period of depression. In 1974, Burlingham's daughter Mabbie arrived in London from her New York home seeking further analysis with Anna, notwithstanding the latter's advice to continue in analysis with her New York analyst. Whilst at the family home in Hampstead she took an overdose of sleeping pills and died in hospital three days later.

Freud was naturalised as a British subject on 22 July 1946. She was elected as a Foreign Honorary Member of the American Academy of Arts and Sciences in 1959 and in 1973 she was made an Honorary President of the International Psychoanalytic Association. In 1967, she was awarded the CBE.

== Death ==
Anna Freud died in London on 9 October 1982. She was cremated at Golders Green Crematorium and her ashes placed in the "Freud Corner" next to her parents' ancient Greek funeral urn. Her life-partner Dorothy Burlingham and several other members of the Freud family also rest there. In 1986, her London home of forty years was transformed, according to her wishes, into the Freud Museum, dedicated to the memory of her father.

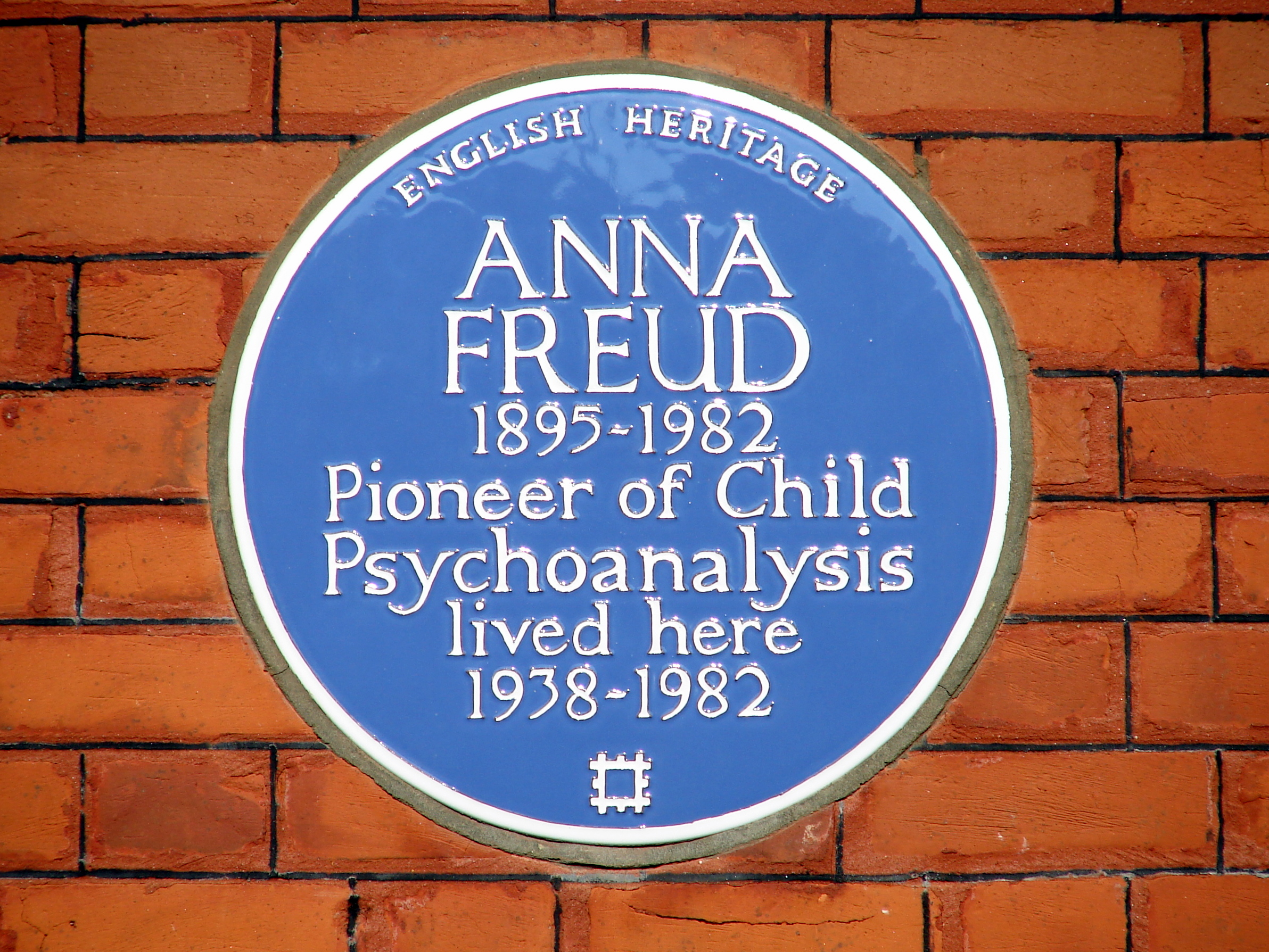
Blue plaque for Freud at 20 Maresfield Gardens

In 2002 Freud was honoured with a blue plaque, by English Heritage, at 20 Maresfield Gardens, Hampstead in London, her home between 1938 and 1982.

== Sexuality ==
In the context of her intimate friendships with Lou Andreas-Salome and in particular with Dorothy Burlingham, with whom she formed a life-long partnership, questions have been raised about Anna Freud's sexual orientation, notwithstanding the absence of any evidence of, and her denials of, any sexual relationships. The historian of psychoanalysis Élisabeth Roudinesco argues that it was repression of her homoerotic sexuality that influenced her in the pathologising of homosexuality in her clinical work as well as in her prominent advocacy of the policy of the International Psychoanalytical Association which debarred homosexuals as candidates for training as psychoanalysts.

== Contributions to psychoanalysis ==
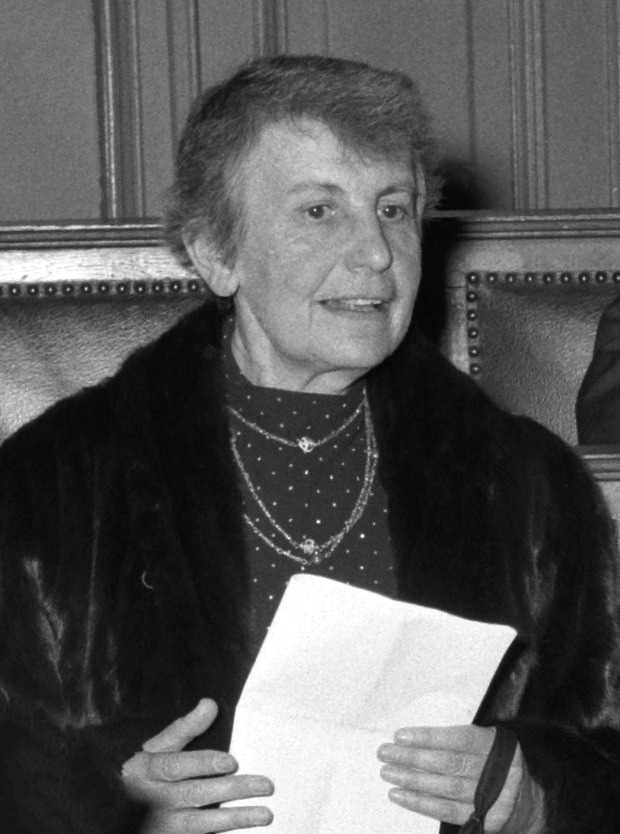
Freud in 1956

Anna Freud was a prolific writer, contributing articles on psychoanalysis to many different publications throughout her lifetime. Her first publication was titled, An Introduction to Psychoanalysis: Lectures for Child Analysts and Teachers 1922–1935, and was the result of four different lectures she was delivering at the time, to teachers and caretakers of young children in Vienna.

Anna Freud's first article Beating Fantasies and Daydreams (1922), "drew in part on her own inner life, but th[at] ... made her contribution no less scientific". In it she explained how, "Daydreaming, which consciously may be designed to suppress masturbation, is mainly unconsciously an elaboration of the original masturbatory fantasies". Her father, Sigmund Freud, had earlier covered very similar ground in A Child is Being Beaten – "they both used material from her analysis as clinical illustration in their sometimes complementary papers" – in which he highlighted a female case where "an elaborate superstructure of day-dreams, which was of great significance for the life of the person concerned, had grown up over the masochistic beating-phantasy ... [one] which almost rose to the level of a work of art".

Her views on child development, which she expounded in 1927 in her first book, An Introduction to the Technique of Child Analysis, clashed with those of Melanie Klein, who "was departing from the developmental schedule that Freud, and his analyst daughter, found most plausible". In particular, Anna Freud's belief that "In children's analysis, the transference plays a different role ... and the analyst not only 'represents mother' but is still an original second mother in the life of the child". became something of an orthodoxy over much of the psychoanalytic world.

For her next major work in 1936, The Ego and the Mechanisms of Defence, a classic monograph on ego psychology and defense mechanisms, Anna Freud drew on her own clinical experience, but relied on her father's writings as the principal and authoritative source of her theoretical insights. To her cataloguing of regression, repression, reaction formation, isolation, undoing, projection, introjection, turning against the self, reversal and sublimation she added here own theorisations of "altruistic surrender" and "identification with the aggressor" in seeking to establish the importance of the ego functions and the concept of defence mechanisms thereby continuing the greater emphasis on the role of the ego than that to be found in the work of her father.

Her work paid special attention to later childhood and adolescent developments – "I have always been more attracted to the latency period than the pre-Oedipal phases" – emphasizing how the "increased intellectual, scientific, and philosophical interests of this period represent attempts at mastering the drives". She formulates the problem posed in adolescence by physiological maturation in terms of how:: "Aggressive impulses are intensified to the point of complete unruliness, hunger becomes voracity... The reaction-formations, which seemed to be firmly established in the structure of the ego, threaten to fall to pieces".

Selma Fraiberg's tribute of 1959 that "The writings of Anna Freud on ego psychology and her studies in early child development have illuminated the world of childhood for workers in the most varied professions and have been for me my introduction and most valuable guide" spoke at that time for most of psychoanalysis outside the Kleinian heartland.

Arguably, however, it was in Anna Freud's London years "that she wrote her most distinguished psychoanalytic papers – including 'About Losing and Being Lost', which everyone should read regardless of their interest in psychoanalysis". Her description therein of "simultaneous urges to remain loyal to the dead and to turn towards new ties with the living" may perhaps reflect her own mourning process after her father's recent death.

Focusing thereafter on research, observation and treatment of children, Anna Freud established a group of prominent child developmental analysts (which included Erik Erikson, Elisabeth Geleerd, Edith Jacobson and Margaret Mahler) who noticed that children's symptoms were ultimately analogue to personality disorders among adults and thus often related to developmental stages. Her book Normality and Pathology in Childhood (1965) summarised "the use of developmental lines charting theoretical normal growth 'from dependency to emotional self-reliance'". Through these then revolutionary ideas Anna provided us with a comprehensive developmental theory and the concept of developmental lines, which combined her father's important drive model with more recent object relations theories emphasizing the importance of parents in child development processes.

Nevertheless, her basic loyalty to her father's work remained unimpaired, and it might indeed be said that "she devoted her life to protecting her father's legacy". In her theoretical work there would be little criticism of him, and she would make what is still the finest contribution to the psychoanalytic understanding of passivity, or what she termed "altruistic surrender, excessive concern and anxiety for the lives of his love objects".

Jacques Lacan called Anna Freud "the plumb line of psychoanalysis". He stated that "the plumb line doesn't make a building, [but] it allows us to gauge the vertical of certain problems."

According to her principal biographer, with psychoanalysis continuing to move away from classical Freudianism to other concerns, it may still be salutary to heed Anna Freud's warning about the potential loss of her father's "emphasis on conflict within the individual person, the aims, ideas and ideals battling with the drives to keep the individual within a civilized community. It has become modern to water this down to every individual's longing for perfect unity with his mother ... There is an enormous amount that gets lost this way".

A Review of General Psychology survey, published in 2002, ranked Anna Freud as the 99th-most cited psychologist of the 20th century.

== Selected works ==
- Freud, Anna (1966–1980). The Writings of Anna Freud: 8 Volumes. New York: Indiana University of Pennsylvania (These volumes include most of Freud's papers.)
  - Vol. 1. Introduction to Psychoanalysis: Lectures for Child Analysts and Teachers (1922–1935)
  - Vol. 2. Ego and the Mechanisms of Defense (1936); (Revised edition: 1966 (US), 1968 (UK))
  - Vol. 3. Infants Without Families Reports on the Hampstead Nurseries
  - Vol. 4. Indications for Child Analysis and Other Papers (1945–1956)
  - Vol. 5. Research at the Hampstead Child-Therapy Clinic and Other Papers (1956–1965)
  - Vol. 6. Normality and Pathology in Childhood: Assessments of Development (1965)
  - Vol. 7. Problems of Psychoanalytic Training, Diagnosis, and the Technique of Therapy (1966–1970)
  - Vol. 8. Psychoanalytic Psychology of Normal Development
- Freud in collaboration with Sophie Dann: "An Experiment in Group Upbringing", in: The Psychoanalytic Study of the Child, VI, 1951.

== Sources ==
- Fenichel, Otto (1946). The Psychoanalytic Theory of Neurosis. London.
- Gay, Peter (1988). Freud: A Life for Our Time. London: J. M. Dent & Sons. ISBN 978-0-333-48638-2.
- Phillips, Adam (1994). On Flirtation. London: Harvard University Press. ISBN 978-0-674-63440-4.
- Young-Bruehl, Elisabeth (2008). Anna Freud: A Biography. London: Yale University Press. ISBN 978-0-300-14023-1.
