= Margaret Mahler =

Austrian-born American psychiatrist and psychoanalyst

Margaret Schönberger Mahler
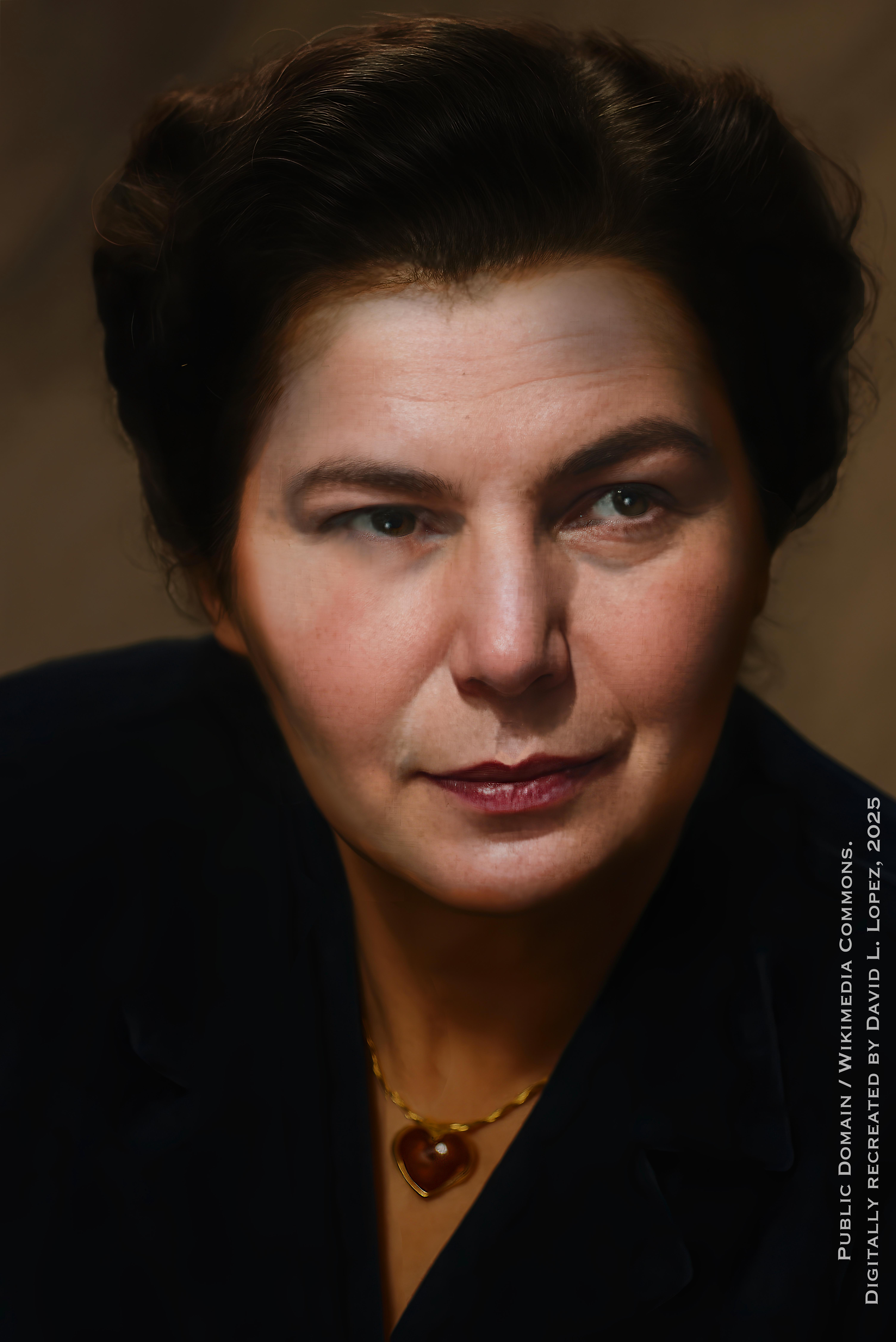
- Born: May 10, 1897; Sopron, Austria-Hungary
- Died: October 2, 1985 (aged 88); New York City, U.S.
- Education: University of Jena (Medicine,1922)
- Known for: Separation–individuation theory of child development
- Awards: APA Agnes Purceil McGavin Award
- Scientific career
- Fields: Psychiatry, Psychoanalysis, Pediatrics
- Workplaces: Margaret S. Mahler Psychiatric Research Foundation

Margaret Schönberger Mahler (May 10, 1897 in Ödenburg, Austria-Hungary; October 2, 1985 in New York) was an Austrian-American psychiatrist, psychoanalyst, and pediatrician. She did pioneering work in the field of infant and young child research. On the basis of empirical studies, she developed a development model that became particularly influential in psychoanalysis and Object relations theory. Mahler developed the separation–individuation theory of child development.

== Biography ==
Born Margaret Schönberger on May 10, 1897, into a Jewish family in Ödenburg, a small town near Vienna to Gustav Schönberger, an Austrian physician and president of the Jewish community, one of the notables of Ödenburg, and Eugenia Schönberger, née Wiener. She and a younger sister had a difficult childhood as a result of their parents' troubled marriage. Margaret's father, however, encouraged her to excel in mathematics and other sciences. After completing the Höhere Mädchenschule, she attended Vaci Utcai Gimnazium in Budapest, even though it was unusual at the time for a woman to continue formal education. Budapest was of great influence on her life and career. She met the influential Hungarian psychoanalyst Sándor Ferenczi, became fascinated by the concept of the unconscious, and was encouraged to read Sigmund Freud.

In September 1916, she began Art History studies at the University of Budapest, but in January 1917 switched to the Medical School. Three semesters later she began medical training at the Ludwig-Maximilians-Universität München, but was forced to leave because of Antisemitism. In spring 1920, she transferred to the University of Jena and it was there that she began to realize how important play and love were for infants in order for them to grow up mentally and physically healthy. After graduating cum laude in 1922, she left for Vienna in order to get her license to practice medicine. There she turned from pediatrics to psychiatry and, in 1926, started her training analysis with Helene Deutsch. Seven years later, she was accepted as an analyst. Working with children became her passion. She loved the way the children gave her their attention and showed their joy in cooperating with her.

In 1936 she married Paul Mahler. Following the Nazis' rise to power, the couple moved to Britain and then, in 1938, to the United States. After receiving a New York medical license, Margaret Mahler set up private practice in a basement and began to rebuild her clientele. She initially received a poor reception in New York, but found a welcoming analytic home in Philadelphia, invited to teach at the Philadelphia Psychoanalytic Institute in 1950. She eventually travelled between New York and Philadelphia on the weekends and become the chair of the Philadelphia Institute's child division. In 1939 she met Benjamin Spock and, after giving a child analysis seminar in 1940, she became senior teacher of child analysis. She joined the Institute of Human Development, the Educational Institute and the New York Psychoanalytic Society. In 1948 she worked on clinical studies on Benign and Malignant Cases of Childhood Psychosis.

Barnard College, at its 1980 commencement ceremonies, awarded her its highest honor, the Barnard Medal of Distinction.

Schönberger Mahler died on October 2, 1985.

== Work ==
Margaret Mahler worked as a psychoanalyst with young children.

In 1950 she and Manuel Furer founded the Masters Children's Centre in Manhattan (it was connected with Mount Sinai hospital). There she developed the Tripartite Treatment Model, in which the mother participated in the treatment of the child. Mahler initiated a more constructive exploration of severe disturbances in childhood and emphasized the importance of the environment on the child. She was especially interested in mother-infant duality and carefully documented the impact of early separations of children from their mothers. This documentation of separation-individuation was her most important contribution to the development of psychoanalysis.

Separation-individuation can be viewed as the psychological birth of an infant, which occurs over a period of time when the child separates from the mother and begins to individuate.

Mahler shed light on the normal and abnormal features of the developmental ego psychology. She worked with psychotic children, while psychosis hadn't been covered in the psychoanalytic treatment yet.

Symbiotic child psychosis struck her. The symptomatology she saw as a derailment of the normal processes whereby self-representations (the representation of one's self) and object-representations (the representation of a familiar person) become distinct. Her most important work is The Psychological Birth of the Human Infant: Symbiosis and Individuation, written in 1975 with Fred Pine and Anni Bergman.

== Separation–individuation theory of child development ==
In Mahler's theory, child development takes place in phases, each with several sub phases:

- Normal autistic phase – First few weeks of life. The infant is detached and self-absorbed. Spends most of his/her time sleeping. Mahler later abandoned this phase, based on new findings from her infant research. She believed it to be non-existent. The phase still appears in many books on her theories.
- Normal symbiotic phase – Lasts until about 5 months of age. The child is now aware of his/her mother but there is not a sense of individuality. The infant and the mother are one, and there is a barrier between them and the rest of the world.
- Separation–individuation phase – The arrival of this phase marks the end of the Normal symbiotic phase. Separation refers to the development of limits, the differentiation between the infant and the mother, whereas individuation refers to the development of the infant's ego, sense of identity, and cognitive abilities. Mahler explains how a child with the age of a few months breaks out of an "autistic shell" into the world with human connections. This process, labeled separation–individuation, is divided into subphases, each with its own onset, outcomes and risks. The following subphases proceed in this order but overlap considerably.
  - Hatching – first months. The infant ceases to be ignorant of the differentiation between him/her and the mother. "Rupture of the shell". Increased alertness and interest for the outside world. Using the mother as a point of orientation.
  - Practicing – from 9 to about 16 months. Brought about by the infant's ability to crawl and then walk freely, the infant begins to explore actively and becomes more distant from the mother. The child experiences himself still as one with his mother.
  - Rapprochement – 15–24 months. In this subphase, the infant once again becomes close to the mother. The child realizes that his physical mobility demonstrates psychic separateness from his mother. The toddler may become tentative, wanting his mother to be in sight so that, through eye contact and action, he can explore his world. The risk is that the mother will misread this need and respond with impatience or unavailability. This can lead to an anxious fear of abandonment in the toddler. A basic 'mood predisposition' may be established at this point. Rapprochement is divided into a few subphases:
    - Beginning – Motivated by a desire to share discoveries with the mother.
    - Crisis – Between staying with the mother, being emotionally close and being more independent and exploring.
    - Solution – Individual solutions are enabled by the development of language and the superego.

Disruptions in the fundamental process of separation–individuation can result in a disturbance in the ability to maintain a reliable sense of individual identity in adulthood.

== Object constancy ==
Object constancy describes the phase when the child understands that the mother has a separate identity and is truly a separate individual. She is separate, but not in the way a toy is separate from him. She is a beloved person that he cathects to. The word "object" is a fine old British word that means, "a significant other that is important to us", i.e. mother or father. Object constancy enables a child to leave mother for a period of time without feeling separation anxiety. He can do this because he can keep mother as an internal object in his mind. This internalization supplies the child with an unconscious level of guiding support and comfort from their mothers.

== Selected works ==
- On human symbiosis and the vicissitudes of individuation, 1969.
- The psychological birth of the human infant: symbiosis and individuation, 1975.
- Infantile psychosis and early contributions
- Rapprochement - critical subphase, separation - individuation
- Separation - individuation

== See also ==
- Autism
- Psychoanalysis
- Refrigerator mother theory
