= Ernst Kris =

American art historian

Ernst Walter Kris (Austrian German: [ˈkrɪs]; April 26, 1900 – February 27, 1957) was an Austrian psychoanalyst and art historian.

== Life ==
Kris was born in 1900 to Leopold Kris, a Jewish lawyer, and Rosa Schick in Vienna, Austria-Hungary.

Kris not only practiced as a psychoanalyst, he also worked as an art historian and published articles on art history. As a psychoanalyst, he made some important contributions to the psychology of the artist and the psychoanalytic interpretation of works of art and caricature. In the review Imago he published his first psychoanalytic study, Ein geisteskranker Bildhauer (A mentally ill sculptor) on Franz Xaver Messerschmidt.

During the end of the 1910s and the beginning of the 1920s, Kris studied art history under Max Dvořák and Julius von Schlosser at the Department of Art History at the University of Vienna, from which he received his doctorate in 1922. One of the professors was Emanuel Loewy, a friend of Sigmund Freud.

In 1927 Kris married Marianne Rie, the daughter of another friend of Freud, Oscar Rie. They had two children. Kris and his wife both became psychoanalysts and Kris began to publish psychoanalytic papers.

A year later, in 1928, Kris intensified his working relationship with Freud, and he became a member of the Vienna Psychoanalytic Society. Between 1930 and 1938, Kris worked as a lecturer at the Vienna Psychoanalytic Institute.

In 1933, Freud asked Kris to become editor of the Imago magazine, in which he published a paper relating art to psychology in 1936. He argued that the difference between the artist and the psychotic is that the artist can return from the world of his imagination to the real world, while the psychotic cannot.

In 1938, Kris fled to England, after Hitler invaded Austria. In England he became a lecturer and training analyst in London at the Institute of Psychoanalysis, until 1940. He also established a working relationship with art historian Ernst Gombrich concerning the art of caricature. At the same time, Kris analyzed Nazi radio broadcasts for the BBC, as his friend Gombrich also did.

In 1940, Kris and his family moved to New York, where he became a visiting professor at the New School for Social Research, where he founded the Research Project on Totalitarian Communication (1941–44) alongside Hans Speier. In 1943 he began to work as a lecturer at the New York Psychoanalytic Institute and the College of the City of New York.

In 1945 he co-founded the journal The Psychoanalytic Study of the Child with Anna Freud and Marie Bonaparte.

In 1946, Kris became a fellow of the American Orthopsychiatric Association and an associate of the American Psychological Association. He also became a member of the editorial board of the Journal of the American Psychoanalytic Association.

Kris dedicated the last years of his life to the psychoanalytic theory, ego psychology, early childhood development and a theory of psychoanalytic technique.

Kris was one of the first developers of the new ego psychology, a school of psychoanalysis that originated in Freud's structural model. He proposed a new way to enter the unconscious; not via a fast and immediate entrance, but via exploration by the surface. It consists of exposing defense mechanisms and not of exploring the id.

Kris died in New York City in 1957.

== Publications ==
Some of his most influential articles, articles in books or books are:

- Psychoanalytic explorations in art (book)
- Comments on the Formation of Psychic Structure (article[s] in book)
- The Recovery of Childhood Memories in Psychoanalysis (article)
- On Some Vicissitudes of Insight in Psycho-Analysis (article)
