= Electra complex =

Jungian psychological concept

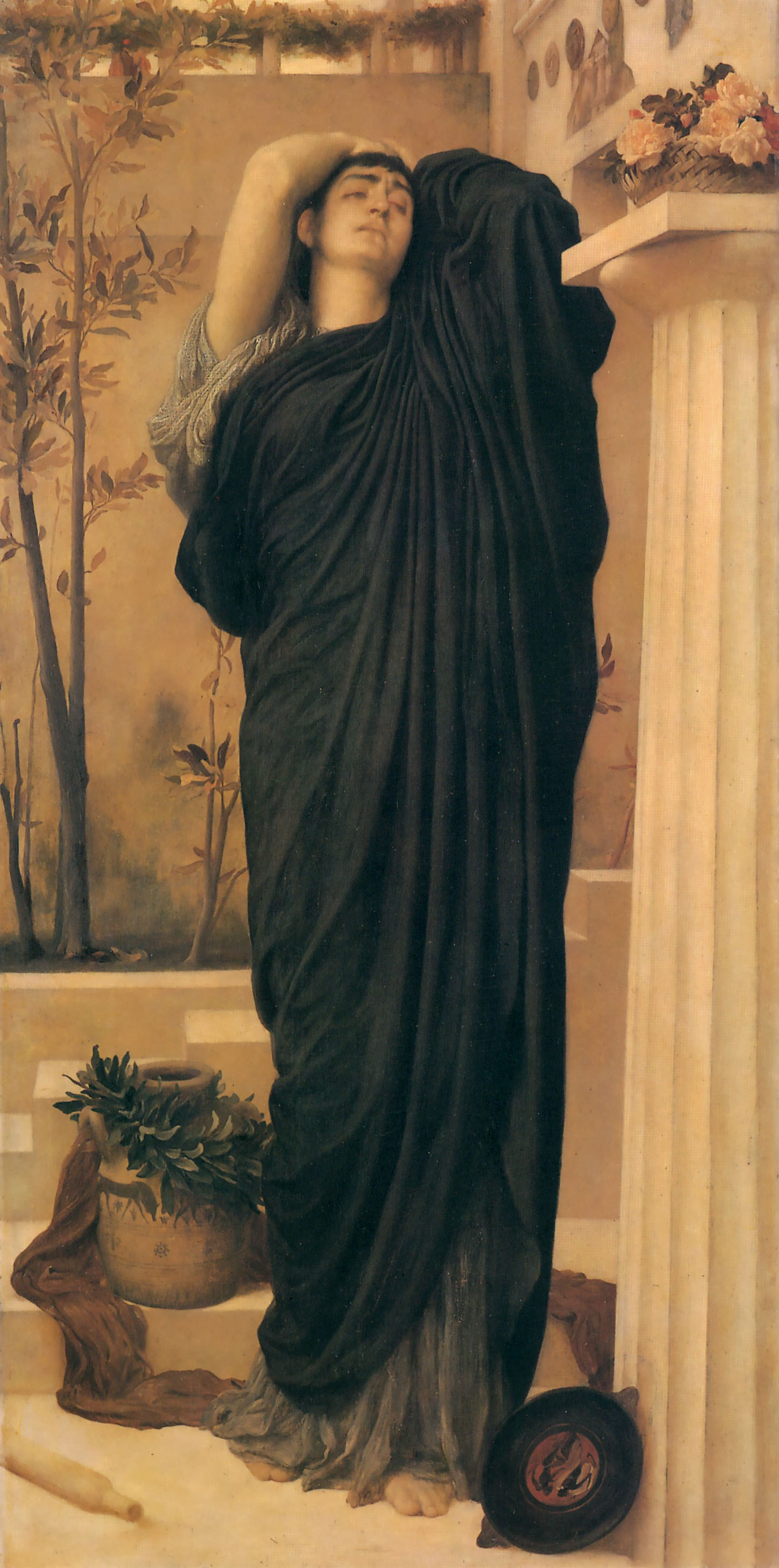
Electra at the Tomb of Agamemnon by Frederic Leighton, c. 1869

In neo-Freudian psychology, the Electra complex, as proposed by Swiss psychiatrist and psychoanalyst Carl Jung in his Theory of Psychoanalysis, is a girl's psychosexual competition with her mother for possession of her father. In the course of her psychosexual development, the complex is the girl's phallic stage; a boy's analogous experience is the Oedipus complex. The Electra complex occurs in the third—phallic stage (ages 3–6)—of five psychosexual development stages: the oral, the anal, the phallic, the latent, and the genital—in which the source of libido pleasure is in a different erogenous zone of the body.

The idea of the Electra complex is not widely used by mental health professionals today. There is little empirical evidence for it, as the theory's predictions do not match scientific observations of child development. It is not listed in the Diagnostic and Statistical Manual of Mental Disorders.

== Background ==
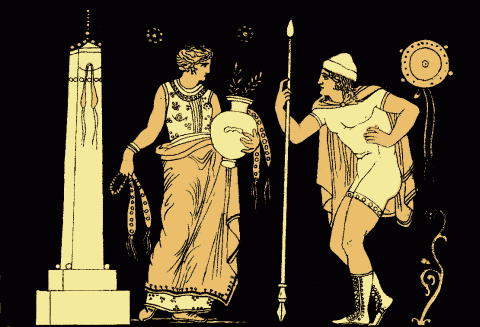
Electra and Orestes, matricides

As a psychoanalytic term for daughter–mother psychosexual conflict, the Electra complex derives from the Greek mythological character Electra, who plotted matricidal revenge with Orestes, her brother, against Clytemnestra, their mother, and Aegisthus, their stepfather, for their murder of Agamemnon, their father (cf. Electra, by Sophocles). Ironically, Clytemnestra was avenging the death of her other daughter, Iphigenia, who was sacrificed to the gods by her own father, Agamemnon. Sigmund Freud developed the female aspects of the sexual development theory—describing the psychodynamics of a girl's sexual competition with her mother for sexual possession of the father— as the feminine Oedipus attitude and the negative Oedipus complex. It was Carl Jung who coined the term Electra complex in 1913. Freud rejected Jung's term as psychoanalytically inaccurate: "what we have said about the Oedipus complex applies with complete strictness to the male child only, [and] we are right in rejecting the term 'Electra complex', which seeks to emphasize the analogy between the attitude of the two sexes".

In forming a discrete sexual identity (ego), a girl's decisive psychosexual experience is the Electra complex: daughter–mother competition for possession of the father. It is in the phallic stage (ages 3–6), when children become aware of their bodies, the bodies of other children, and the bodies of their parents that they gratify physical curiosity by undressing and exploring each other and their genitals — the erogenous center — of the phallic stage; thereby learning the physical sex differences between male and female, "boy" and "girl". When a girl's initial sexual attachment to her mother ends upon discovering that she — the daughter — has no penis, she then transfers her libidinal desire (sexual attachment) to her father and increases sexual competition with her mother.

== Characteristics ==
The psychodynamic nature of the daughter–mother relationship in the Electra complex derives from penis envy, caused by the mother, who also caused the girl's castration; however, upon re-aligning her sexual attraction to her father (heterosexuality), the girl represses the hostile female competition for fear of losing the love of her mother, since girls tend to form stronger bonds with their mothers than boys do with their fathers because children usually pass more time with their mothers than with their fathers. This internalization of "Mother" develops the super-ego as the girl establishes a discrete sexual identity (ego). Without a penis, the girl cannot sexually possess her mother, as the infantile id demands. Consequently, the girl redirects her desire for sexual union upon her father, and thus progresses to heterosexual femininity, which culminates in bearing a child who replaces the absent penis. Moreover, after the phallic stage, the girl's psychosexual development includes transferring her primary erogenous zone from the infantile clitoris to the adult vagina. Freud thus considered the feminine Oedipus attitude ("Electra complex") to be more emotionally intense than the Oedipal conflict of a boy, resulting, potentially, in a woman with a submissive, less confident personality.

In both sexes, defense mechanisms provide transitory resolutions of the conflicts between the drives of the Id and the drives of the ego. The first defense mechanism is repression, the blocking of memories, emotional impulses, and ideas from the conscious mind; yet it does not resolve the Id–Ego conflict. The second defense mechanism is identification, by which the child incorporates, to their ego, the personality characteristics of the same-sex parent; in so adapting, the girl facilitates identifying with the mother, because she understands that, in being females, neither of them possesses a penis, thus are not antagonists.

== Case studies ==
A 1921 study of patients at a New York state mental hospital, On the Prognostic Significance of the Mental Content in Manic-Depressive Psychosis, reported that of 31 manic-depressive patients studied, 22 (70%) had been diagnosed with an Electra complex; and that 12 of the 22 patients had regressed to early stages of psychosexual development.

== In culture ==
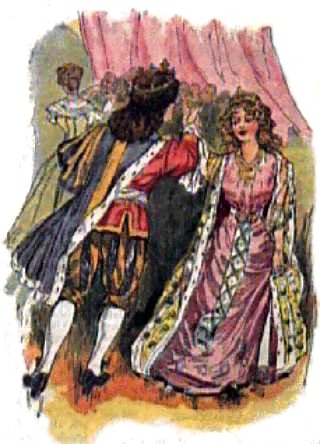
Prince Charming hero meets Cinderella heroine (1912)

Some purported examples of the Electra complex in literature come from psychoanalytic literary criticism and archetypal literary criticism, which flourished in the mid-twentieth century. These theories attempt to identify universal symbols in literature theorized to represent patterns in the human psyche. Psychoanalytic literary critics have claimed to discover the Electra complex in fairy tales and other historic sources. In addition, some authors who were conversant in Freud and Jung's work, such as Sylvia Plath, made intentional use of the Electra complex symbol.

=== Fiction ===
According to psychoanalytic literary criticism, fiction affords people the opportunity to identify with the protagonists of fantastic stories depicting what might be if they could act upon their desires. Often, in aid to promoting social conformity, the myth, story, stage play, or film presents a story meant to frighten people from acting upon their desires. In the course of infantile socialization, fairy tales fulfill said function; boys and girls identify with the hero and heroine in the course of their adventures. Often, the travails of hero and heroine are caused by an evil stepmother who is envious of him, her, or both, and will obstruct their fulfilling of desire. Girls, especially in the three-to-six year age range, can especially identify with a heroine for whom the love of a prince charming will sate her penis envy. Moreover, stories such as Cinderella have two maternal figures, the stepmother (society) and the fairy godmother; stepmother represents the girl's feelings towards mother; the fairy godmother teaches the girl that her mother loves her, thus, to have mother's love, the girl must emulate the good Cinderella, not the wicked stepsisters.

Portrayals of Electra in Ancient Greece did not generally present her devotion to her father as sexually motivated; however, since the early twentieth century, adaptations of the Electra story have often presented the character as exhibiting incestuous desires.

=== Poetry ===
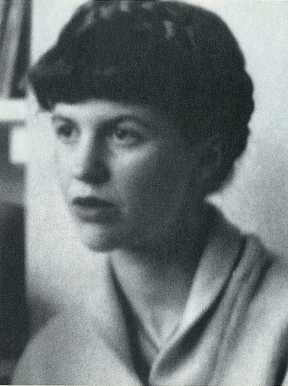
Sylvia Plath employed the Electra complex in poetry

American poet Sylvia Plath (1932–1963) acknowledged that the poem Daddy (1962) is about a woman, afflicted with an unresolved Electra complex, who conflates her dead father and derelict husband in dealing with having been emotionally abandoned. Her biographers noted a psychologic irony about the life of the poet Plath: she knew her father for only eight years, before he died; she knew her husband for eight years, before she killed herself. Her husband was her substitute father, psychosexually apparent when she addresses him (the husband) as the "vampire father" haunting her since his death. In conflating father and husband as one man, Sylvia Plath indicates their emotional equality in her life; the unresolved Electra complex.

=== Music ===
On their self-titled album, the alternative music group Ludo have a song titled "Electra's Complex".

In 2021, electronic musician Arca released Electra Rex as a preview for her album Kick iii. The song is a combination of the Electra complex and Oedipus complex in "a nonbinary psychosexual narrative".

== Criticism ==
Because of their similarity, the Electra complex is exposed to much of the criticism that the Oedipus complex has faced, including a lack of empirical evidence and an apparent inapplicability to single parent or same-sex parent households. In addition, it was later rejected by Freud himself, and some of its implications are regarded as sexist towards women.

=== Lack of evidence ===
There is very little scientific evidence for the reality of the Electra complex. The predictions of the theory are not substantiated by experiment. The Electra complex is not widely accepted among modern mental health professionals and is not listed in current versions of the Diagnostic and Statistical Manual of Mental Disorders.

=== As cover for sexual abuse ===
Social worker Florence Rush has accused the female Oedipus complex of being a tool to cover up sexual abuse of children by their parents, particularly by their fathers. Rush writes that when Freud's female patients told him of being abused as children, he first took them seriously, resulting in Freud's seduction theory that mental illness is caused by sexual abuse. Then, however, Freud became uncomfortable with the implication of widespread sexual abuse that this theory implied. He replaced it with the Oedipus complex theory, which allowed Freud to dismiss women's stories of childhood abuse as imaginary, writing "I was able to recognize in this phantasy of being seduced by the father the typical Oedipus complex in women." Rush refers to this dismissal as the Freudian coverup.

=== Criticism by Freud ===
Freud was critical of the premise behind Jung's idea, writing in 1931 "It is only in the male child that we find the fateful combination of love for the one parent and simultaneous hatred for the other as a rival," though at other times he seems to accept the premise of the Electra complex. Freud never made clear his view of the applicability of the Oedipus complex to girls or women.

=== As sexist ===
A number of authors have observed that Freud's theories were based on men and then extended to women as an afterthought, with the result that they fit women poorly. For example, the idea that women want to have a penis or believe they have been castrated appears to assume that women feel like defective men. This phallocentrism has been described as sexist. The idea that women must give up clitoral sexual stimulation to be psychologically healthy is contradicted by evidence.

Some feminist authors reexamine or appropriate Freud's ideas to make their points about the sexism in the female Oedipus complex. For example, Hélène Cixous's 1976 play Portrait of Dora reconstructs the story of patient Ida Bauer, whom Freud gave the pseudonym Dora. Cixous portrays Dora's alleged hysteria as a reasonable reaction to her father's misbehavior, with Freud hired to cover it up.

== See also ==
- Feminism and the Oedipus complex
- Genetic sexual attraction
- Triad (sociology)
