= Nachlass =

Collection left behind when a scholar dies

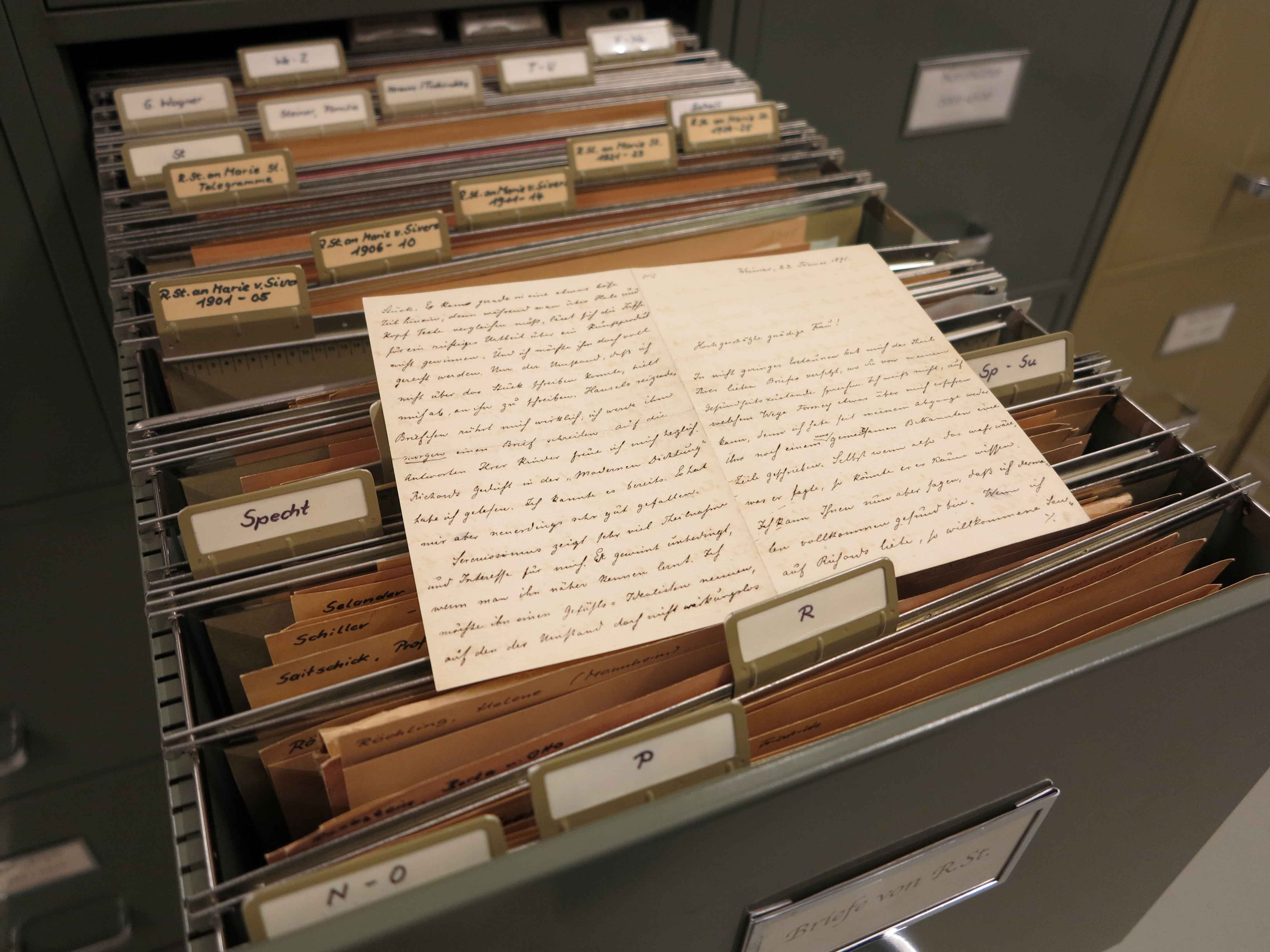
The Nachlass of the Austrian philosopher Rudolf Steiner is housed in the Rudolf Steiner Archiv in Dornach, Switzerland. This file drawer houses the philosopher's letters to individuals with surnames from N through Z.

Nachlass (German pronunciation: [ˈnaːxlas], older spelling Nachlaß) is a German word, used in academia to describe the collection of manuscripts, notes, correspondence, and so on left behind when a scholar dies. The word is a compound in German: nach means "after", and the verb lassen means "to leave". The plural can be either Nachlasse or (with Umlaut) Nachlässe. The word is not commonly used in English; and when it is, it is often italicized or printed in capitalized form to indicate its foreign provenance.

== Editing and preserving a Nachlass ==
The Nachlass of an important scholar is often placed in a research library or scholarly archive. Other workers in the scholar's area of specialization may obtain permission to comb through the Nachlass, seeking important unpublished scholarly contributions or biographical material. The content of a Nachlass can be catalogued, edited, and in some cases published in book form.

Such documentary publication is more difficult for a Nachlass that contains a great deal of material, such as that of Gottfried Leibniz. In such cases, it may not be financially possible to publish its entire contents. The Nachlass of Ludwig Wittgenstein, kept at the University of Bergen, has been digitized and published in compact disc format.

Klagge and Nordmann note a conflict that faces a documentary editor choosing what to publish of the draft material from a Nachlass: to understand a scholar (in this case Wittgenstein) "as he would want to be understood, we should focus on the works that came closest to passing muster with him." Yet publication of draft material may perhaps assist in a deeper understanding of the published versions, and also help understand the process whereby the scholar created his or her works.

A much-debated question is whether the writings an author did not publish can be legitimately used, alongside those they published, to reconstruct their thought. Huang (2019) take the view that such worries about the use of the Nachlass are unnecessary.

== The author's viewpoint ==
Sometimes it is known what the original scholar's view was concerning what should be done with his or her Nachlass, and these views differ greatly. Near the end of his life Gottlob Frege wrote to his adopted son:

Kleinen, 12 January 1925

Dear Alfred,

Do not scorn my handwritten material. Even if all is not gold, there is gold in it nevertheless. I believe that some of it will one day be held in much greater esteem than now. See to it that nothing gets lost.

With love, your father

It is a large part of myself that I here bequeath to you.

Frege's wishes came very near to being unfulfilled: his Nachlass, although duly archived in the library of the University of Münster, is believed to have been destroyed in 1945 by an Allied bombing raid during the Second World War. However, it survived in typewritten copies produced by Heinrich Scholz. The texts were edited and finally published in 1969.

The philosopher Edmund Husserl developed a strong commitment to his Nachlass (which included about 40,000 pages of sketches) during the last years of his life, allowing his colleagues to sort and classify it. Bernet, Kern, and Marbach suggest that because Husserl had difficulty in putting his thoughts into a definitive, publishable form, he accordingly attached great importance to the survival of his notes. In fact, because Husserl was of Jewish ethnicity and died in Germany in the year 1938, his Nachlass only narrowly escaped destruction under the Nazi regime.

Alfred North Whitehead, in contrast, asked that his Nachlass be destroyed, a wish that his widow carried out. According to Lowe (1982), Whitehead "idealized youth and wanted young thinkers to develop their own ideas, not spend their best years on a Nachlass." Gilbert Ryle likewise disapproved of scholars spending their time editing a Nachlass. According to Anthony Palmer, he "hated the Nachlass industry and thought that he had destroyed everything of his that he had not chosen to publish himself so that there would be no Ryle Nachlass." ("One or two" papers (Palmer) did survive, however, and were published.)

Henri Bergson's Nachlass was destroyed by his widow at his request. Lawlor and Moulard suggest that the destruction of Bergson's papers, by depriving later scholars of the stimulation of examining a Nachlass, actually affected his posthumous standing: "The lack of archival material is one reason why Bergson went out of favor during the second half of the Twentieth Century."

== Notable Nachlässe ==
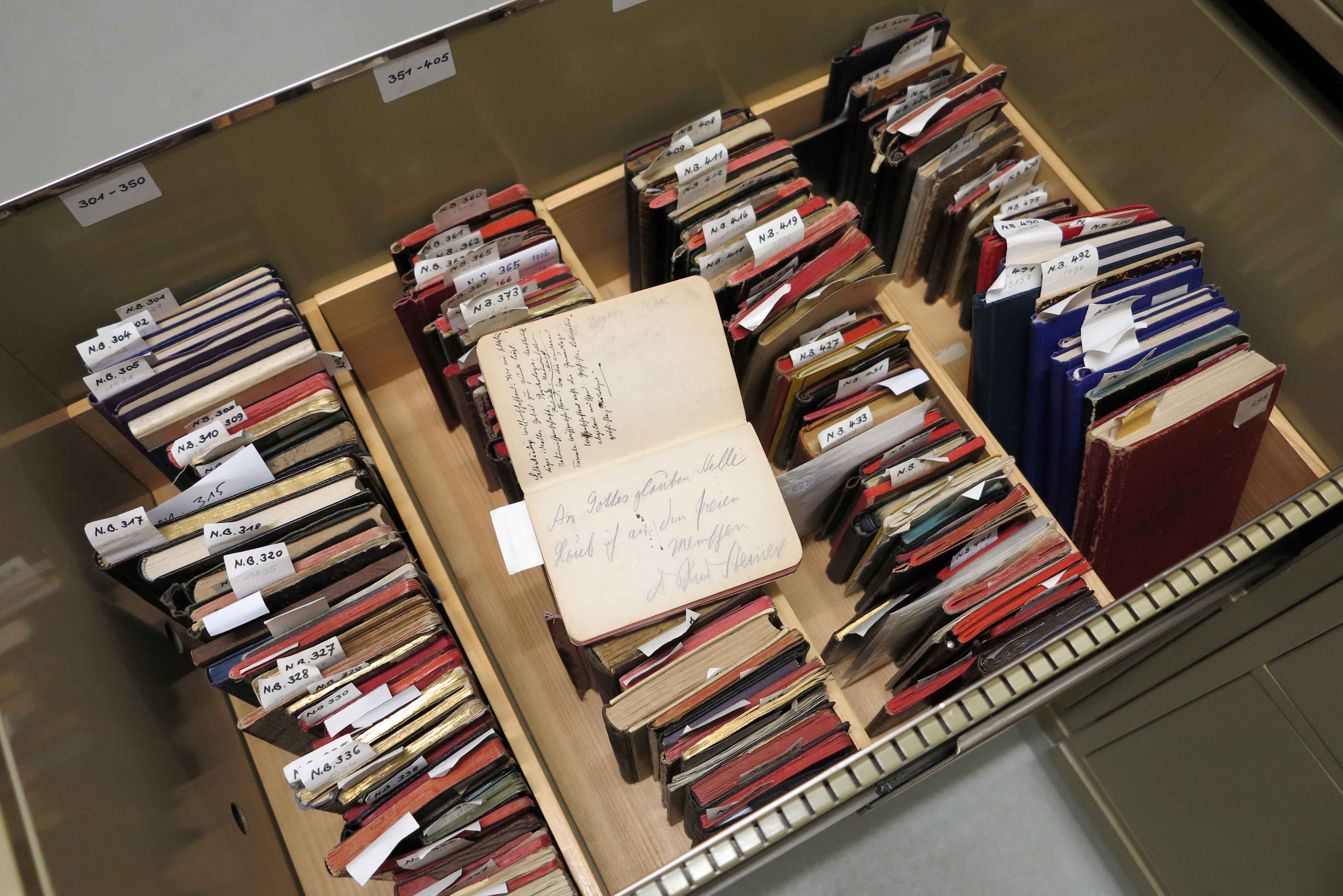
Small notebooks in the Steiner archive.

- Gottfried Leibniz (1646–1716) left a Nachlass which contains over 200,000 pages of works in philosophy, theology, history, mathematics, science, politics, and physics in seven languages and remains largely unpublished today.
- Carl Friedrich Gauss (1777–1855) left a Nachlass that surprised other mathematicians, as it revealed that "he had gone quite a way to discovering non-Euclidean geometry."
- Bernhard Riemann (1826–1866) left notable mathematical problems, which remain unsolved, within his Nachlass. Marcus Du Sautoy writes:

Most mathematicians passing through Göttingen take the time to visit the library to examine Riemann's famous unpublished scribblings, his Nachlass. Not only is it a moving experience to feel a bond with such an important figure in the history of mathematics, but the Nachlass still contains many unsolved mysteries, locked inside Riemann's illegible scribbles. It has become the Rosetta stone of mathematics.

- Friedrich Nietzsche (1844–1900) left a large Nachlass. From it, his sister Elisabeth Förster-Nietzsche and his friend Heinrich Köselitz (a.k.a. Peter Gast) compiled the text they called The Will to Power. Nietzsche's Nachlass has been translated into many languages, and an English translation is being published by Stanford University Press.
- Sigmund Freud (1856–1939) left a Nachlass which played an important role as the basis for Jeffrey Moussaieff Masson's 1984 book The Assault on Truth: Freud's Suppression of the Seduction Theory, which led to a huge scholarly dispute, including a lawsuit.
- Robert Musil (1880–1942) has within his unfinished novel The Man Without Qualities a second volume, subtitled "Aus dem Nachlass", consisting primarily of miscellaneous notes and sketches, left incomplete at the time of Musil's death. This Nachlass, published posthumously by Musil's widow, is included in both the German and in translated English publications of the work.
- Ludwig Wittgenstein (1889–1951) only published one book during his life. All others have been compiled from his Nachlass, which has been published by the University of Bergen.

== In German ==
Use of the word in German is not limited to academic contexts. It is frequently used to refer to the entirety of a person's estate after they died, usually in the context of inheritance.

== See also ==
- Literary executor
