= The Assault on Truth =

1984 book by Jeffrey Moussaieff Masson

The Assault on Truth: Freud's Suppression of the Seduction Theory
- Cover of the first edition
- Author: Jeffrey Moussaieff Masson
- Language: English
- Subjects: Sigmund Freud; Freud's seduction theory
- Publisher: Farrar, Straus and Giroux
- Publication date: 1984
- Publication place: United States
- Media type: Print (Hardcover and Paperback)
- Pages: 308 (first edition); 343 (1998 Pocket books edition)
- ISBN: 978-0345452795

The Assault on Truth: Freud's Suppression of the Seduction Theory is a book by the former psychoanalyst Jeffrey Moussaieff Masson, in which the author argues that Sigmund Freud, the founder of psychoanalysis, deliberately suppressed his early hypothesis, known as the seduction theory, that hysteria is caused by sexual abuse during infancy, because he refused to believe that children are the victims of sexual violence and abuse within their own families. Masson reached this conclusion while he had access to several of Freud's unpublished letters as projects director of the Sigmund Freud Archives. The Assault on Truth was first published in 1984 by Farrar, Straus and Giroux; several revised editions have since been published.

The book prompted massive publicity and controversy. It received many negative reviews, several of which rejected Masson's reading of psychoanalytic history. It was condemned by reviewers within the psychoanalytic profession, and came to be seen as the latest in a series of attacks on psychoanalysis and an expression of a widespread "anti-Freudian mood". The book has received criticism from both supporters and critics of psychoanalysis. Its overall reception has been described as mixed. Some feminists endorsed Masson's conclusions, and other commentators have seen merit in his book. Masson has been criticized for supposedly 'misrepresenting' the seduction theory and maintaining that it was correct. He has also been criticized for his discussion of Freud's treatment of his patient Emma Eckstein, for suggesting that children are by nature innocent and asexual, and for taking part in a reaction against the sexual revolution.

== Summary ==
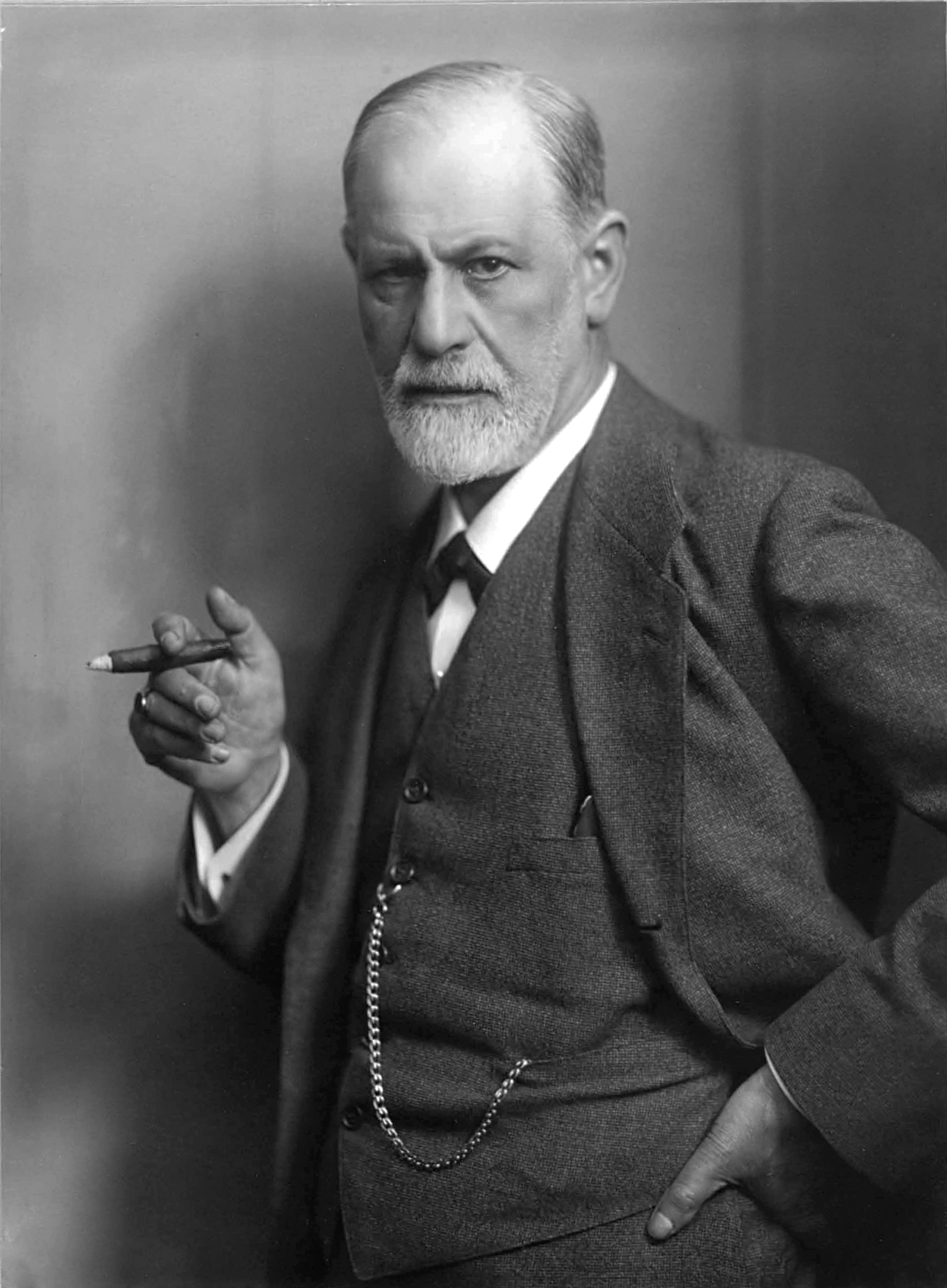
Sigmund Freud, the founder of psychoanalysis. Masson argues that Freud deliberately suppressed the seduction theory.

Masson argues that the accepted account of the way in which, Sigmund Freud, the founder of psychoanalysis, abandoned his seduction theory is incorrect. In the Preface of 2012 edition, Masson stated that "when it comes to one major human experience, sexual trauma, Freud was right only briefly, and then, forevermore wrong." Freud initially proposed that his patients' mental illnesses were rooted in real-life sexual abuse as female patients told him in 1895 and 1896, but nine years later he shifted his stance, claiming these traumatic memories were actually internal sexual fantasies (known as the "Oedipus complex").

Masson argues that Freud was wrong to disbelieve his female patients and that the real reason Freud abandoned the seduction theory is that he could not accept that children are "the victims of sexual violence and abuse within their own families". He suggests that Freud's theories of "internal fantasy and of spontaneous childhood sexuality", which he developed after abandoning the seduction theory, allowed sexual violence to be attributed to the victim's imagination, and therefore posed no threat to the existing social order. Masson acknowledges the tentative nature of his reinterpretation of Freud's reasons for abandoning the seduction theory. He criticizes other accounts of Freud's work, including that provided by the psychoanalyst Ernest Jones in The Life and Work of Sigmund Freud (1953-1957). He also discusses Freud's 1896 essay "The Aetiology of Hysteria", which he provides in an appendix. He also discusses the work of the doctor Auguste Ambroise Tardieu, Freud's treatment of Emma Eckstein, Freud's theory of the Oedipus complex, and Freud's relationship with the psychoanalyst Sándor Ferenczi.

== Background and publication history ==
According to the historian Roy Porter, Masson, formerly a Sanskrit professor, retrained as a psychoanalyst, and in the 1970s found support within the psychoanalytic profession in the United States. Masson's relationship with the psychoanalyst Kurt R. Eissler helped Masson become the projects director of the Freud Archives, where he was entrusted with publishing the authorized edition of the correspondence between Freud and Wilhelm Fliess. Masson aroused controversy after presenting his views about the origins of Freud's psychoanalytic theories in a paper delivered at a 1981 meeting of the Western New England Psychoanalytic Society. The New York Times printed two articles reporting Masson's views, as well as an interview with him. Eissler fired Masson, who retaliated with writs. The journalist Janet Malcolm published two articles about the controversy (later issued as a book, In the Freud Archives [1984]) in The New Yorker.

Many of Masson's conclusions had earlier been reached by Florence Rush, who made a public presentation of them in 1971 in New York (forming The Freudian Coverup theory).

The Assault on Truth was first published by Farrar, Straus and Giroux in 1984. Revised editions followed in 1985, 1992, 1998, and 2003.

== Reception ==
=== Overview ===
The Assault on Truth provoked controversy and prompted massive publicity. The book received notice in publications such as Newsweek, Maclean's, The New York Times Book Review, and New Statesman and Society. In Maclean's, the book was described as the latest in a series of attacks on psychoanalysis, and Masson was quoted saying, "I think that as a result of my findings, we should give up on psychoanalysis as a means of helping people." In The New York Times Book Review, the critic Harold Bloom described the book as "dubious". In New Statesman and Society, Jenny Turner dismissed the book, accusing Masson of spite, misreadings, and making inept arguments.

The book received attention and endorsement from some feminists. The feminist lawyer Catharine MacKinnon described The Assault on Truth as a revealing discussion of Freud. However, the critic Camille Paglia criticized feminists for their interest in Masson's work, deeming it part of an obsession with exposing the failings of great figures. Porter described the book as "tendentious", but a necessary corrective to The Life and Work of Sigmund Freud, a work that in his view depicted Freud in an overly positive way. He observed that it received a mixed response because of the circumstances surrounding its publication, which included the growing public distrust of psychoanalysis since the 1960s, especially among feminists, and that it was condemned by psychoanalysts and their supporters. Commentators supportive of psychoanalysis who criticized the book include the historian Peter Gay, the philosopher Richard Wollheim, the historian Paul Robinson, the social theorist Anthony Elliott, and the psychoanalyst Kurt R. Eissler. Gay called the book a "sensational polemic" and wrote that Masson had confused discussion of Freud's seduction theory and that Masson's suggestions about why Freud abandoned the theory were preposterous. Wollheim wrote that the book was a vehement work that presented questionable conclusions.

Robinson wrote that The Assault on Truth was an expression of an "anti-Freudian mood" that was growing more aggressive in the 1980s. He suggested that Masson interpreted Freud's work exclusively in terms of a preoccupation with the seduction theory. He accused Masson of claiming, without clear evidence, that the seduction theory was correct, largely ignoring the reasons Freud gave for abandoning the theory, and failing to show that Freud did not consider those reasons persuasive. He accused Masson of misleadingly editing Freud's letters with Fliess. He also maintained that opposition to the seduction theory was based on rational skepticism rather than an inability to accept the existence of childhood sexual abuse, and that it was extremely unlikely that Freud would abandon the seduction theory out of cowardice only to then adopt the provocative theory of infantile sexuality. He was unconvinced by Masson's attempts to use evidence such as Freud's treatment of Eckstein and a paper by Ferenczi to support his views. He argued that Masson viewed children as "innocent and inert", and suggested that Masson's work was part of a reaction against the sexual revolution. He compared The Assault on Truth to two works by psychologists, Frank Sulloway's Freud, Biologist of the Mind (1979) and Marianne Krüll's Freud and His Father (1979). Eissler wrote that while The Assault on Truth achieved success, the book was a "literary hoax". He accused Masson of misrepresenting the seduction theory by failing to explain that it claimed that "adult psychopathology emerges exclusively when a child's genitalia had been abused", and of falsely claiming that Freud disputed the existence of "infantile abuse" after abandoning the theory. Elliott noted that the book became a best-seller. However, he argued that Masson misrepresented Freud, and that his critique of Freud is flawed, since "Freud did not dispute his patients' accounts of actual seduction and sexual abuse", being concerned rather with the way in which "external events are suffused with fantasy and desire".

The book also received criticism from commentators critical of psychoanalysis, such as the philosopher Adolf Grünbaum, the authors Allen Esterson and Richard Webster, and the critic Frederick Crews. Grünbaum argued that regardless of the merits of Masson's accusation that Freud abandoned the seduction theory out of cowardice, Masson's position that "actual seductions" are the etiological factors in the development of hysteria is unfounded and credulous. Esterson wrote that while Masson charged Freud with a failure of nerve by asserting that his patients' reports of childhood seductions were mostly childhood fantasies it was questionable whether they had indeed reported childhood seductions. Esterson also discussed the book in History of the Human Sciences, and History of Psychology, where he wrote that the evidence it presents does not support Masson's claims about how the medical community responded to Freud's seduction theory, and that other evidence and research, which Masson ignores, refutes Masson's claim that "Freud's early psychoanalytic writings received an irrationally hostile reception".

Webster compared the book to E. M. Thornton's The Freudian Fallacy (1983). He suggested that Masson retained a partly positive view of Freud. While he credited Masson with making contributions to the history of psychoanalysis, he wrote that Masson's main argument has not convinced either psychoanalysts or the majority of Freud's critics, since scholars have disputed that Freud formulated the seduction theory on the basis of memories of childhood seduction provided by his patients. Webster stated that the theory maintained that episodes of childhood seduction would have a pathological effect only if the victim had no conscious recollection of them, and the purpose of Freud's therapeutic sessions was not to listen to freely offered recollections but to encourage his patients to discover or construct scenes of which they had no recollection. He blamed Masson for encouraging the spread of the recovered memory movement by implying that most or all serious cases of neurosis are caused by child sexual abuse, that psychoanalysts were collectively engaged in a massive denial of this fact, and that an equally massive collective effort to retrieve painful memories of incest was required. Masson rejected Webster's suggestion, stating that he had expressed no interest in memory retrieval in the book.

Crews wrote that The Assault on Truth was a naive work that made Masson a celebrity. Crews maintained that Masson had failed to learn from critiques of the book, and that its arguments depended on fallacies. In The New York Review of Books, Crews called the book a melodramatic work in which Masson misrepresented "Freud's 'seduction' patients as self-aware incest victims rather than as the doubters that they remained". Other authors who have discussed the book include the literary scholar Ritchie Robertson, the psychologist Louis Breger, and the scholar John Kerr. Robertson wrote that Masson overstated the case against Freud, observing that while Freud may have underestimated the frequency of child abuse, he did not deny that it does often occur. Breger wrote that Masson provided valuable information on the later life of Eckstein and was correct to question the accepted account of the abandonment of the seduction theory. However, he found Masson's speculations about why Freud abandoned the theory unconvincing. Kerr described the book as flawed but useful in bringing psychoanalytic attention to childhood sexual abuse.

=== Reviews ===
The Assault on Truth received negative reviews from the historian Peter Gay in The Philadelphia Inquirer, the psychoanalyst Anthony Storr in The New York Times Book Review, Stephen A. Mitchell in Library Journal, Herbert Wray in Psychology Today, the psychoanalyst Charles Rycroft in The New York Review of Books, the philosopher Arnold Davidson in the London Review of Books, the philosopher Frank Cioffi in The Times Literary Supplement, Charles Hanly in The International Journal of Psycho-Analysis, the university lecturer Richard Skues in the British Journal of Psychotherapy, and Lawrence Birken in Theory & Society. The book received positive reviews from the psychiatrist Judith Lewis Herman in The Nation and Pierre-E. Lacocque in the American Journal of Psychotherapy. The book was also reviewed by Ms., The Economist, and Choice. Other reviews included those by the historian Paul Robinson in The New Republic, Elaine Hoffman Baruch in The New Leader, Michael Heffernan in New Statesman, Kenneth Levin in the American Journal of Psychiatry, Thomas H. Thompson in North American Review, F. S. Schwarzbach in The Southern Review, the psychiatrist Bob Johnson in New Scientist, Thelma Oliver in the Canadian Journal of Political Science, the psychoanalyst Donald P. Spence in the American Journal of Orthopsychiatry, Gary Alan Fine in Contemporary Sociology, D. A. Strickland in the American Political Science Review, Franz Samelson in Isis, and the philosopher John Oulton Wisdom in Philosophy of the Social Sciences.

Storr dismissed the book and denied that Freud would have abandoned a theory "because it was unacceptable to the medical establishment". Mitchell wrote that while Masson provided fascinating excerpts from important documents relating to Freud that had previously been carefully guarded, his conclusions were "characterized by a bitter tendentiousness, simplistic rhetoric, and a serious lack of comprehension of the subtleties of later psychoanalyic theorizing". Wray dismissed Masson's arguments as "speculative". Rycroft maintained that because Masson chose to present the book as a polemical attack on Freud, it did not qualify as a contribution to the early history of psychoanalysis. He accused Masson of ignoring contrary evidence, presenting unconvincing evidence, and being unable to "distinguish between "facts, inferences, and speculations". However, he granted that Masson had discovered some information likely to permanently damage Freud's image, including evidence that Freud was more familiar with the forensic literature on child abuse than his works suggested. The information also included details about Freud and Fliess's bungled treatment of Eckstein, and evidence that Freud's repudiation of Ferenczi and his 1932 paper “Confusion of Tongues between Adults and the Child” "was provoked by Ferenczi's having rediscovered the truth of the seduction theory that he had suppressed thirty-five years". He criticized Masson for wanting to re-establish the truth of the seduction theory without presenting evidence that it was actually correct, and concluded that the book was "distasteful, misguided, and at times silly". In response, Masson defended the book and accused Rycroft of various errors.

Hanly wrote that while it had provoked controversy, reviewers had largely dismissed the book. He expressed agreement with the negative reviews it had already received, and criticized Masson's claim that Freud interpreted Eckstein's bleeding followed a nasal operation as hysterical, arguing that it misrepresented what Freud wrote. Birken argued that Masson's attempt to revive the seduction theory was more important than his speculations about why Freud abandoned it. He maintained that Masson's repudiation of all of psychoanalysis since the abandonment of the seduction theory meant that his book was "highly conservative", and that it had "won an important place in the growing literature of cultural conservatism that takes its stand against the emergence of mass culture based on consumption". According to Birken, by rejecting the Oedipus complex, Masson "repudiates the development of an autonomous sexual science", and by reviving the seduction theory he denies that children have any sexuality. He found that Masson's affection for Tardieu suggested a rejection of the conventional historiography of sexual science. He suggested that Masson de-sexualized not only children, but also, by implication, women.

Herman described the book as well-documented, well-written, carefully reasoned, and fascinating. However, she suggested that Masson's charge that Freud abandoned the seduction theory out of personal cowardice might be overly harsh, arguing that it overstated the role of Freud as an individual and ignored the general secrecy surrounding the issues of rape and incest. She wrote that while Masson did not definitively resolve the question of why Freud abandoned the seduction theory, he was right to reopen the issue. She credited Masson with demonstrating that once Freud abandoned the seduction theory, any further consideration of its possible validity became "a heresy" within psychoanalysis. She also praised Masson for documenting Freud's attempt to stop Ferenczi from publicizing his rediscovery of "the kind of clinical data on which the seduction theory was based". She criticized the press coverage that The Assault on Truth had received, writing that the press had attempted to defend a "psychoanalytic establishment" that had been rendered "speechless" by it. According to Herman, reviews of The Assault on Truth had been almost uniformly negative. She accused critics of making ad hominem attacks on Masson or criticizing him by focusing on issues that were of secondary importance, and faulted Janet Malcolm for her unflattering characterizations of Masson in The New Yorker.

Lacocque described the book as impressive. He praised Masson's scholarship.

== See also ==
- Freud: A Life for Our Time
- The Freudian Coverup
- Why Freud Was Wrong
