= The Freudian Fallacy =

1983 book by Elizabeth M. Thornton

- Cover of the first edition
- Author: Elizabeth M. Thornton
- Language: English
- Subject: Sigmund Freud
- Publisher: Blond & Briggs
- Publication date: 1983
- Publication place: United Kingdom
- Media type: Print (Hardcover and Paperback)
- Pages: 351 (1986 Paladin edition)
- ISBN: 978-0586085332

The Freudian Fallacy, first published in the United Kingdom as Freud and Cocaine, is a 1983 book about Sigmund Freud, the founder of psychoanalysis, by the medical historian Elizabeth M. Thornton, in which the author argues that Freud became a cocaine addict and that his theories resulted from his use of cocaine. The book received several negative reviews, and some criticism from historians, but has been praised by authors critical of Freud and psychoanalysis. The work has been compared to Jeffrey Masson's The Assault on Truth (1984).

== Reception ==
The Freudian Fallacy received a mixed review from Wray Herbert in Psychology Today and a negative review from the psychoanalyst Jeffrey Satinover in Library Journal. The book was also reviewed by Michael Neve in the London Review of Books, the psychoanalyst Anthony Storr in The Times Literary Supplement, and the historian Paul Roazen in the American Journal of Psychiatry, A. J. Fogarty in the British Medical Journal, and was discussed by the psychiatrist E. Fuller Torrey in National Review.

Herbert wrote that Thornton "bitterly resented" Freud and his influence. Herbert believed that the book benefited from Thornton's knowledge of 19th-century medical literature and that the work "brings to life the research laboratories of Paris and Vienna during neurology's infancy", but that its value was undermined by Thornton's willingness to make "wild pronouncements without any supporting evidence". Satinover wrote that the book suffered from "specious neurologic diagnoses and misinterpretations of psychoanalytic theory" and that Thornton failed to discredit Freud. Torrey, writing in 1995, commented that Thornton's suggestion that Freud almost certainly continued to abuse cocaine until 1899 had been substantiated by the historian and Freud scholar Peter Swales.

The book was criticized by the historian Peter Gay, who described it as "a model in the literature of denigration", and the historian Roy Porter, who called it "tendentious". However, it was praised by the psychologist Hans Eysenck and other writers critical of psychoanalysis. The philosopher Todd Dufresne described the book as a notable work on the history of psychoanalysis, and the single best work on Freud's cocaine period. The author Richard Webster called the book interesting. He considered some of Thornton's claims both original and persuasive, and suggested that her detailed review of the medical context within which Jean-Martin Charcot and Freud worked contains many neglected insights. However, he found Thornton's discussion of Charcot and hysteria more significant than her argument that Freud's theories were shaped by his cocaine use. He argued that Thornton takes her argument about the organic basis of hysteria too far, and this tended to discredit her more reasonable claims. Webster observed that the book has sometimes been endorsed by feminists. He compared it to Jeffrey Masson's The Assault on Truth, another book marked by hostility to Freud and psychoanalysis. According to Webster, The Freudian Fallacy received negative reviews in The Times Literary Supplement and the London Review of Books, the latter of which included an accusation of anti-Semitism. He criticized the press coverage that the book received in Britain, calling The Sunday Times Magazine′s treatment of Thornton's claims about Freud's addiction to cocaine sensational and shallow.

== See also ==
- Why Freud Was Wrong
