= Sigmund Freud Archives =

Collection of documents related to the Austrian psychotherapist

The Sigmund Freud Archives mainly consist of a trove of documents housed at the US Library of Congress and in the former residence of Sigmund Freud during the last year of his life, at 20 Maresfield Gardens in northwest London. The archives comprise Freud's tapes, letters and papers. It was founded in 1951 by Kurt R. Eissler among others, and received contributions from Anna Freud.

It was at the center of a complicated scandal, described by Janet Malcolm in her book In the Freud Archives and by Jeffrey Masson in his book Final Analysis.

== History ==
=== Early history ===
The Archives were founded by Kurt R. Eissler in 1951, together with a group of people who knew Freud personally, including Heinz Hartmann, Ernst Kris, Bertram Lewin and Hermann Nunberg. It was directed by Eissler for decades after its founding. Eissler prevented many well-meaning scholars from seeing many Freud documents, claiming confidentiality, even when their donors had not requested nor demanded confidentiality and even when no potential victims of the revelation of those documents existed. By the 1980s, Eissler, with the help of Anna Freud, had expanded the collection to include thousands of items.

=== Masson controversy ===
Eissler was introduced to Masson in 1974. Masson was appointed secretary, and Eissler intended for Masson to succeed him as director, which he did in 1980. Being an officer of the Archives, Masson had administrative access to all its documents, and he was therefore allowed to see anything he wanted breaking the seal whenever necessary.

In 1981, Masson published a paper in which he claimed that Freud's abandonment of his seduction theory had taken place for reasons not related to the scientific merit of the theory, namely that Freud believed that granting the truth of his female patients' claims that they had been sexually abused would risk the reputation of the emerging psychoanalytic method. Masson said that "Freud began a trend away from the real world that, it seems to me, has come to a dead halt in the present-day sterility of psychoanalysis throughout the world."

Eissler was deeply shocked ("Just today Masud Khan called me from London and asked me to dismiss you from the Archives. The board members, all of them, or at least most of them, are asking for the same."), and Masson was subsequently dismissed from his job at the Archives, whereupon followed three lawsuits and a well-publicized scandal.

=== Recent history ===
Harold P. Blum succeeded Masson and Eissler as Executive Director. He was succeeded by Louis Rose, who is the current director as of 2026. The other current officers are Jennifer Stuart as President, Nellie L. Thompson as Secretary, and W. Craig Tomlinson as Treasurer.

== Literature ==
- Janet Malcolm: In the Freud Archives, New York, Knopf, 1984, ISBN 0-394-53869-2. Paperback edition, New York, Vintage Books, 1985, ISBN 0-394-72922-6. British edition, London, Papermac, 1997, ISBN 0-333-64471-9. New edition, with an afterword by the author, New York, New York Review Books, 2002, ISBN 1-59017-027-X.
- Jeffrey Moussaieff Masson: The Assault on Truth: Freud's Suppression of the Seduction Theory. New York, Farrar, Straus and Giroux, 1984, ISBN 0-374-10642-8.
- Jeffrey Moussaieff Masson: Final Analysis: The Making and Unmaking of a Psychoanalyst. Reading, Massachusetts, Addison-Wesley, 1990, ISBN 0-201-52368-X. Paperback edition, New York, Ballantine Books, 2003, ISBN 0-345-45278-X, GTIN 9780345452788.
- Swales, Peter J. (24 October 1985). "The Freud Archives". The New York Review of Books.

== See also ==
- Girindrasekhar Bose
- Janet Malcolm
- Jeffrey Moussaieff Masson
- Peter Swales (historian)
- Freud's seduction theory
