= Ambroise Tardieu =

French cartographer and engraver (1788–1841)

- Born: 2 March 1788; Paris, France
- Died: 17 January 1841 (aged 52); Paris, France
- Occupations: Cartographer; engraver; publisher

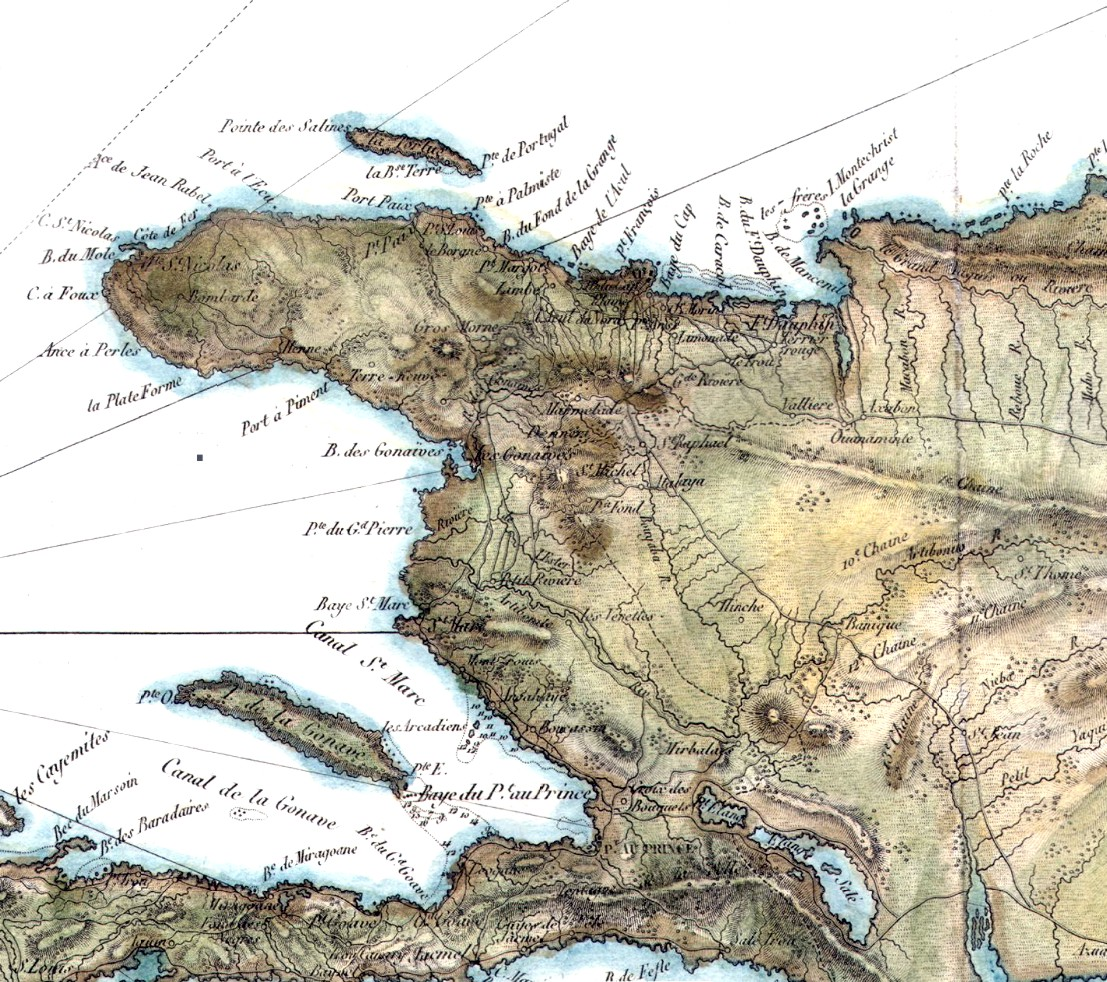
Portion of Saint-Domingue map by Tardieu

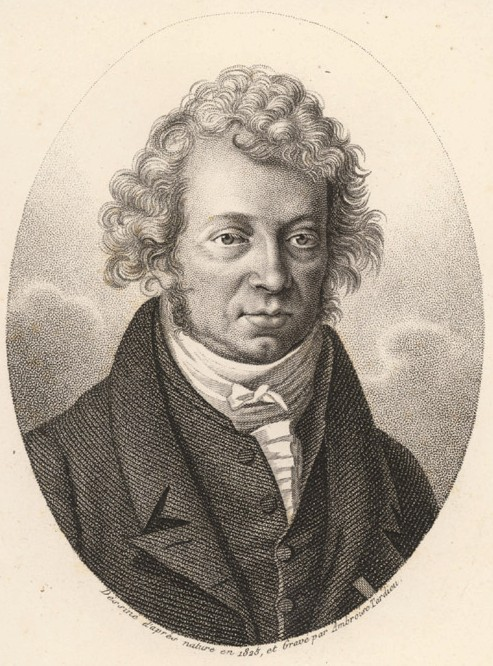
André-Marie Ampère by Tardieu, 1825

Ambroise Tardieu (2 March 1788 – 17 January 1841) was a French cartographer and engraver, and is celebrated for his version of John Arrowsmith's 1806 map of the United States.

== Biography ==
Tardieu's son, Auguste Ambroise Tardieu (1818–1879), was also an artist and a famous forensic medical scholar, who supplied the illustrations for Pierre François Olive Rayer's three-volume Traité des maladies des reins (1839–41), a treatise on diseases of the kidneys. Neither should be confused with Jean Baptiste Pierre Tardieu, an unrelated French cartographer and engraver active in the early 19th century.

Tardieu came from a family boasting a number of fine engravers, and was trained from an early age by his uncle, Pierre Alexandre Tardieu (1756–1844), a leading French engraver. Showing considerable talent in this field, Ambroise persevered and became a celebrated engraver of portraits. In addition he was appointed as geographical engraver for the French government, for which he received a small stipend. In order to eke out this meagre wage, he began to trade in prints, books and maps. He is remembered for more than 800 portraits engraved through his career, many depicting scientists of the period.

Tardieu published a number of atlases, one of which appeared in 1842 and was titled Atlas universel de geographie, ancienne et moderne/dresse par Ambroise Tardieu pour l'intelligence de la Geographie universelle par Malte-Brun. He also published an inflatable terrestrial globe.
