= Freudian coverup =

Theory about Sigmund Freud

The Freudian coverup is a theory introduced by social worker Florence Rush in 1971, which asserts that Sigmund Freud intentionally ignored evidence that his patients were victims of sexual abuse. The theory argues that in developing his theory of infant sexuality, he misinterpreted his patients' claims of sexual abuse as symptoms of repressed incestuous desires. Therefore, Freud claimed that children who reported sexual abuse by adults had either imagined or fantasized the experience.

Rush introduced the Freudian coverup in her presentation The Sexual Abuse of Children: A Feminist Point of View, about childhood sexual abuse and incest, at the April 1971 New York Radical Feminists (NYRF) Rape Conference.

The theory (though under a different name) was given further promotion in 1984 through the publishing of the book The Assault on Truth: Freud's Suppression of the Seduction Theory, by psychoanalyst Jeffrey Moussaieff Masson. He believed he independently came to the same conclusion as Rush through his review of the materials in the Freud Archives.

== Background ==
Early in Freud's career, he believed that girls often experienced sexual abuse, since most of his patients were women and consistently reported childhood instances of sexual molestation. Many of Freud's patients suffered from a common Victorian diagnosis, hysteria. Since his hysterical patients repeatedly reported sexual abuse, most often naming their fathers as the abusers, Freud drew a causal connection between sexual abuse and neurosis. This became the frame for the seduction theory, in which he pointed to a direct connection between sexual abuse in childhood and adult hysteria. According to Florence Rush, author of The Freudian Cover-up, this repeated and persistent incrimination of fathers by his patients made him uneasy, and led him to abandon the seduction theory. More at ease with the fantasy rather than reality of sexual abuse, Freud was even more comfortable when he could name the mother rather than the father as the seducer. Hence, the "Oedipal complex" came into fruition. Other feminists who supported Rush's claims are Susan Brownmiller, Louise Armstrong, and Diana Russell.

Before Freud could conclude that the seduction by fathers was a fantasy, he had to be rid of his earlier theory. Since men did not complain of maternal seduction Freud limited the imagined abuse to a specific female problem. To remove the responsibility from fathers, Freud found it necessary to undermine the perceptions of his female patients.

Within the period between the 1970s and 1980s, and 1990s, arguments were made that Freud abandoned his initial beliefs in women's accounts of abuse (the Seduction theory), and replaced it with the Oedipal theory; this illustrates the ways in which he withheld or altered information from his patients, which is unacceptable in a professional context. The Freudian Cover-up argued that Freud refused to name the offender and attempted to hide illegal or immoral sex practices. It was within this time that Victorian men were permitted to indulge in forbidden sex, provided they managed to keep their indiscretions hidden. Freud, who regarded the incest taboo as vital to the advance of civilization, appeared to demand only that forbidden sex be practiced with tact and discretion so that the surface of Victorian respectability was in no way disturbed. Any attempt on the part of the child or her family to expose the violator would expose her own alleged innate sexual motives and shamed her more than the offender; therefore, concealment was her only recourse.

== Criticism ==
The historian Peter Gay, author of Freud: A Life for Our Time (1988), emphasizes that Freud continued to believe that some patients were sexually abused, but realized that there was a difficulty in determining between truth and fiction. Therefore, according to Gay, there was no sinister motive in changing his theory; Freud was a scientist seeking the facts and was entitled to change his views if new evidence was presented to him.

A different criticism comes from Freud scholars who have examined the original documents and argue that the above account contains several misconceptions. Florence Rush based her account on Freud's later retrospective reports of the 1895-97 episode, which are seriously at variance with the original 1896 papers and other documents which show that it is not the case that Freud's female patients at that time consistently reported childhood instances of sexual molestation. Prior to the 1896 papers he had not reported a single instance of early childhood sexual abuse (and very few cases of any kind of sexual abuse). The very essence of the seduction theory entailed that only unconscious memories of early childhood sexual abuse could result in hysterical or obsessional symptoms, which is inconsistent with the notion of patients coming to him with reports of childhood sexual abuse; on Freud's theory the putative memories were deeply repressed and not accessible to consciousness in normal circumstances. (It is also the case that Freud's 1896 clinical claims were not restricted to women: in the 1896 paper The Aetiology of Hysteria one third of the patients were men.)

Freud twice stated that he would be presenting the clinical evidence for his claims, but he never did so, which critics have argued means that his clinical claims have had to be taken largely on trust. Numerous Freud scholars and academics have voiced serious doubts about the validity of his claim in 1896 to have uncovered unconscious memories (later unconscious fantasies) of infantile sexual abuse, mostly below the age of four.
