= The Aetiology of Hysteria =

1896 paper by Sigmund Freud

"The Aetiology of Hysteria" (German: Zur Ätiologie der Hysterie) is a paper by Sigmund Freud about the child sexual abuse of children before the age of puberty, and its possible causation of mental illness in adults. Presented in April or May 1896, it is where Freud first outlined his seduction theory.

== Context ==
Aetiology means cause. Hysteria was an amorphous medical diagnosis, now sometimes considered to have been a catch-all for various maladies and lifestyle choices. The diagnosis was typically applied to women, but Freud also applied hysteria to men. It was a common diagnosis in Freud's time, with a long history. Freud considered the cause of hysteria to be a great mystery, comparing it to searching for the source of the Nile.

The 1895 book Studies on Hysteria, coauthored by Freud, introduced a technique of exploring memories that would form the basis of "Aetiology of Hysteria".

== Contents ==
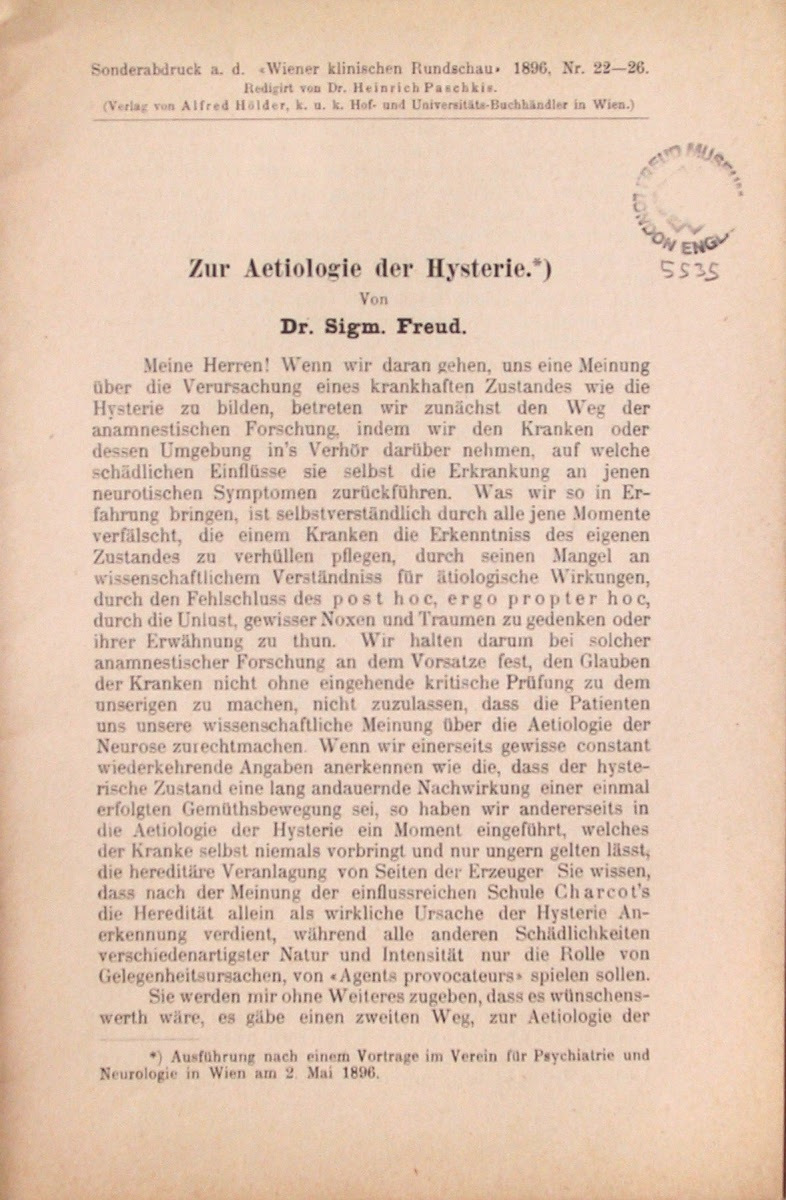
Sigmund Freud's paper Zur Ätiologie der Hysterie

Freud compares seeking the cause of hysteria to unearthing an ancient city in which some things are visible on the surface and some are hidden below. Following the technique of Josef Breuer, Freud expects the cause of hysteria must be traumatic experiences, memories of which continue to act on the mind. The experience must fit the response, for example, hysterical vomiting could be justifiably attributed to seeing a disgusting dead body, but not to a frightening railway accident. Discovering the correct traumatic memory is expected to "resolve" the hysteria

Memories form chains, with more recent memories reminding the patient of earlier memories. The analyst must help the patient mentally traverse back into unconscious portions of the memory chain. Persistent analysis will reveal the earliest memory in the chain, which is invariably one or more premature sexual experiences. Freud says he has observed this in all 18 cases of hysteria he has analyzed, 6 men and 12 women.

Patients are visibly distressed when they uncover the childhood sexual encounter, which is evidence that the remembered events are real. The encounters are sometimes sexual assaults committed by adults, and sometimes sex between children. Freud thinks that sex between children is typically initiated by a boy who was previously "seduced" by an adult woman. Thus hysteria can be transmitted from person to person; when this happens in a family, it may account for the appearance that hysteria is hereditary.

Hysterical people appear to overreact to things only because we cannot see the real stimulus; for example, a girl touched innocently on the hand may become hysterical if she was touched similarly on the hand during a traumatic experience. Freud speculates that childhood sexual abuse may also play a role in other disorders, like paranoia or obsession. He closes by saying he knows he will be disbelieved by some, and asks his critics to note the strength of the Breuer procedure for questioning patients.

== Reactions ==
Freud received a cold reaction from his audience at the Vienna Society for Psychiatry and Neurology, where he presented his paper. Richard von Krafft-Ebing, the sexologist who presided at the reading, remarked that the paper was "a scientific fairy tale." The journal Wiener klinische Wochenschrift, which typically published a summary of each paper and the ensuing discussion, was pointedly silent about Freud's paper, publishing only the author and title.

The central idea in the paper became known as Freud's seduction theory, though scholars have noted "seduction" is a misleading name for the assaults and molestation described in the paper. Under pressure from negative reactions to his work, Freud publicly retracted the seduction theory by 1905. He would later explain hysteria in terms of a new theory, the Oedipus complex. Where the seduction theory had seen unconscious memories of sexual trauma, the Oedipus complex saw repressed sexual fantasies that were considered part of normal childhood development.

Freud's abandonment of seduction theory became a central critique of his work in the subsequent century. Jeffrey Moussaieff Masson and Florence Rush have said that Freud took stories of sexual assault seriously in "The Aetiology of Hysteria," then later betrayed his patients by recasting the memories as sexual fantasies, casting doubt on experiences that were probably real. Thus they accuse Freud of being complicit in covering up sexual assault.
