= Auguste Ambroise Tardieu =

French medical doctor

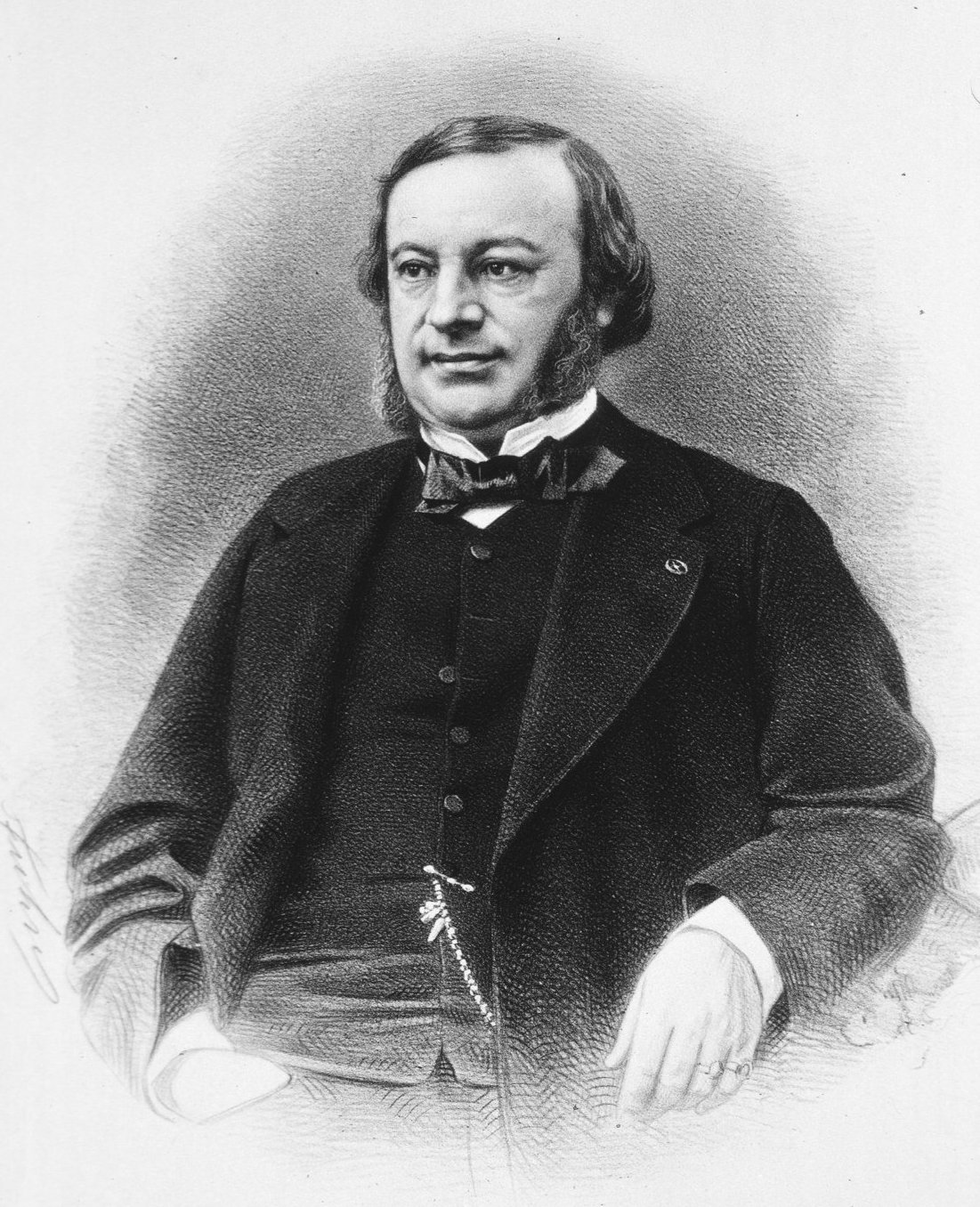
- Born: 10 March 1818; Paris, France
- Died: 12 January 1879 (aged 60)
- Known for: Tardieu's syndrome, Tardieu's ecchymoses, First forensic studies of child maltreatment
- Relatives: Ambroise Tardieu (father)
- Awards: Prize of the French Academy of Sciences (1875)
- Scientific career
- Fields: Forensic science, Public health
- Workplaces: Faculté de Médicine de Paris

Auguste Ambroise Tardieu (10 March 1818 – 12 January 1879) was a French medical doctor and the pre-eminent forensic medical scientist of the mid-19th century.

The son of artist and mapmaker Ambroise Tardieu, he achieved his Doctorate in Medicine at the Faculté de Médecine of Paris. He was President of the French Academy of Medicine, as well as Dean of the Faculty of Medicine and Professor of Legal Medicine at the University of Paris.

Tardieu's specialties were forensic medicine and toxicology. Over his 23-year career, Tardieu participated as a forensic expert in 5,238 cases, including many famous and notorious historical crimes. Using his cases as a statistical base, Tardieu wrote over a dozen volumes of forensic analysis, covering such diverse areas as abortion, drowning, hanging, insanity, homosexuality, poisoning, suffocation, syphilis, and tattoos. In recognition of his first clinical descriptions of battered children, battered child syndrome is also known as Tardieu's syndrome. Tardieu's ecchymoses, subpleural spots of ecchymosis that follow the death of a newborn child by strangulation or suffocation, were first described by Tardieu in 1859, and were so named in his honor.

== Scientific work on sexuality and child abuse ==
His most famous scientific works were a book on forensic toxicology that became a reference work in this field in the 19th century, and a book on the forensic examinations related to ”assault on decency”, a legal term covering indecent exposure, rape and homosexuality. He also wrote a pioneering study on maltreatment against children and he published on the terrible working conditions of young boys and girls in mines and factories. A study of copper workers (both child and adult) led to a radical improvement in their working conditions.

Though Tardieu's textbook on the legal medicine of poisoning was the work that did most to establish him as an authority in his time, for the posterity he is most famous for his forensic study of sexual crimes: Etude Médico-Légale sur les Attentats aux Mœurs. ("Forensic Study of Assaults against Decency"). The study consists of three parts: the first deals with indecent exposures, the second with rape and the third with "pederasty" (sexual relations between an older and a younger man). Written before the term homosexuality was coined, Tardieu sought to identify external signs of committed ”pederasty” which might help the forensic expert present convincing evidence that a crime had been committed to the court of law. In so doing, Tardieu discussed the causes of homosexuality, without making them the main purpose of his study. He presumed some of the "pederasts" had an inborn inclination, but nevertheless considered the sexual practice in question to be a condemnable vice.

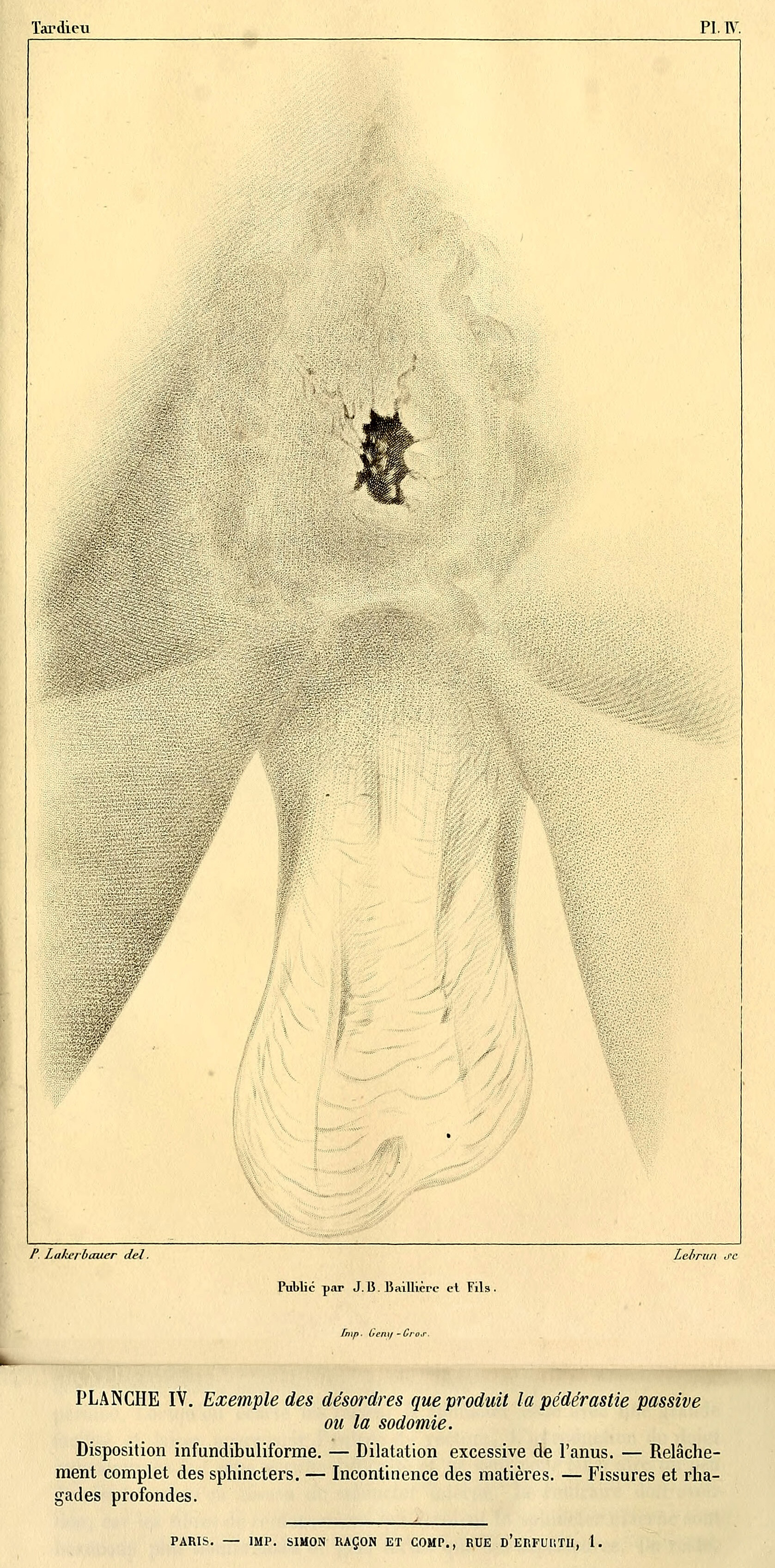
Tardieu's depiction of the effects of "passive sodomy". The caption lists: a funnelled shape, relaxation of the sphincters, incontinence and fissures.

Tardieu believed "pederasts" were either exclusively active or passive during anal sex, and that passive pederasts could be detected via their anus. He described males who received anal sex as exhibiting: "excessive development of the buttocks, funnel shaped deformation of the anus, relaxation of the sphincter, the effacement of the folds, the crests, and the wattles at the circumference of the anus; extreme dilation of the anal orifice; and ulcerations, hemorrhoids, fistules".

According to Tardieu, same-sex sexuality was often linked to crime, such as blackmailing and assassinations. The book was an important precursor to Krafft-Ebing's Psychopathia sexualis, the most famous pre-Freudian study on same-sex sexual practices.

In the section on rape, Tardieu also deals with child abuse. According to his numbers over 75% of all the rapes or attempted rapes tried in French courts were committed against children under 16 years old, and most of those against girls under 12 years old. Additionally, he noted that incestuous rape was not uncommon (also see Sigmund Freud's Seduction Theory). This topic was also dealt with in a separate paper (Etude médico-légale sur les sévices et mauvais traitements exercés sur des enfants i.e. "A Medico-legal Study of Cruelty and Brutal treatment Inflicted on Children"), published in Annales d'hygiène publique et de médecine légale in 1860. This latter work has been retrospectively recognized to be the first scientific or medical book about child sexual abuse. The findings in this study were later republished in the book Étude sur les Blessures, which was published in 1879, the year of Tardieu's death. In this, his last book, Tardieu claimed to have been the first physician to publish on this subject. Nonetheless, Tardieu's research on the subject was largely either sharply criticized or ignored by legal authorities and other clinicians.

== Works ==
- 1843: De la morve et du farcin chronique chez l’homme.
- 1849–50: Mémoire sur les modifications physiques et chimiques que détermine dans certaines parties du corps l’exercice des diverse professions, pour servir à la recherche médico-légale de l’identité.
- 1852: Voiries et cimetières.
- 1855: Études hygiéniques sur la profession de mouleur en cuivre, pour servir à l’histoire des professions exposées aux poussières inorganiques.
- 1855: Étude médico-légale sur le tatouage considéré comme signe d’identité.
- 1856: Étude médico-légale sur l’avortement, suivie d’observations et de recherches pour servir à l’histoire médico-légale des grossesses fausses et simulées.
- 1856: Étude historique et médico-légale sur les sur la fabrication et l’emploi des alumettes chimiques.
- 1857: Étude médico-légale sur les attentats aux moeurs.
- 1852–54: Dictionnaire d’hygiène publique et de salubrité.
- 1860: Etude médico-légale sur les sévices et mauvais traitements exercés sur des enfants
- 1864: Étude médico-légale sur les maladies provoquées ou communiquées comprenant l’histoire médico-légale de la syphilis et de ses divers modes de transmission.
- 1867: Étude médico-légale et clinique sur l'empoisonnement.
- 1868: Étude médico-légale sur l’infanticide.
- 1870: Étude médico-légale sur la pendaison, la strangulation, les suffocations.
- 1872: Étude médico-légale sur la folie.
- 1879: Étude médico-légale sur les maladies produites accidentellement ou involontairement.
- 1879: Étude sur les blessures.

== Legacy ==
His work Étude médico-légale sur les attentats aux moeurs is still used by Egypt as a basis for medical tests to determine if a person is homosexual.

== Bibliography ==
- Masson, Jeffrey Moussaieff (1984). Assault on the Truth. New York: Farrar Straus. ISBN 978-0-374-10642-3.
