= New York Radical Feminists =

American feminist group (1969–1972)

- Abbreviation: NYRF
- Formation: 1969
- Founders: Shulamith Firestone; Anne Koedt
- Founded at: New York City, U.S.
- Dissolved: 1972; 54 years ago

New York Radical Feminists (NYRF) was a radical feminist group founded by Shulamith Firestone and Anne Koedt in 1969, after they had left Redstockings and The Feminists, respectively. Firestone's and Koedt's desire to start this new group was aided by Vivian Gornick's 1969 Village Voice article, “The Next Great Moment in History Is Theirs”. The end of this essay announced the formation of the group and included a contact address and phone number, raising considerable national interest from prospective members. NYRF was organized into small cells or "brigades" named after notable feminists of the past; Koedt and Firestone led the Stanton-Anthony Brigade.

Central to NYRF's philosophy was the idea that men consciously maintained power over women in order to strengthen their egos, and that women internalized their subordination by diminishing their egos. This analysis represented a rejection of the two other prevailing theories of women's subordination current at the time – Redstockings' "Pro-Woman Line", which emphasized men's subordination of women and women's often deliberate adaptations to that reality, and The Feminists' theory that emphasized women's subordination as being rooted in the unconscious playing out of internalized sex roles. NYRF created a manifesto titled, “Politics of the Ego: A Manifesto for N.Y. Radical Feminists”, in 1970. Acceptance of this manifesto was required to gain membership. The manifesto defined radical feminism as a political ideology that recognizes how society maintains men's power over women. Its primary thesis was that, in all societies, men's egos were the key reason for male supremacy over women. In essence, it declared, the main purpose of male chauvinism was to promote psychological ego.

Shulamith Firestone and Anne Koedt left NYRF in 1970 over disagreements about organization and leadership with other factions of NYRF. Nonetheless, the group continued to be active through the mid-1970s. Its activities during that time included holding a monthly consciousness raising meeting, publishing a regular newsletter, and maintaining a speaker's bureau. NYRF also organized a number of public conferences and speakouts through the early to mid-1970s on topics such as rape, sexual abuse, prostitution, marriage, lesbianism, motherhood, illegitimacy, class, and work. Florence Rush introduced The Freudian Coverup in her presentation "The Sexual Abuse of Children: A Feminist Point of View," about childhood sexual abuse and incest, at the April 1971 NYRF Rape Conference. Rush's paper at the time was the first challenge to Freudian theories of children as the seducers of adults rather than the victims of adults' sexual/power exploitation.

A 1971 speak-out led by the New York Radical Feminists is considered one of the first feminist efforts to bring rape to the public’s attention. The New York Radical Feminists framed rape as a tool to maintain patriarchal control and silence women in contrast to the popular conception of the time that rape was committed by a few bad men or was the victims' fault. Additionally, The New York Radical Feminists called out male-dominated institutions such as law enforcement and hospitals for failing to protect women and often re-victimizing them.

In 1972 Lisa Orlando aided by Barbara Getz wrote The Asexual Manifesto for the NYRF Asexual Caucus.

In 1982, NYRF was listed among the signatories to a leaflet produced by the "Coalition for a Feminist Sexuality and Against Sadomasochism", an ad hoc coalition put together by Women Against Pornography to protest the Barnard Conference.
