= Freud's seduction theory =

Abandoned 1890s psychological hypothesis

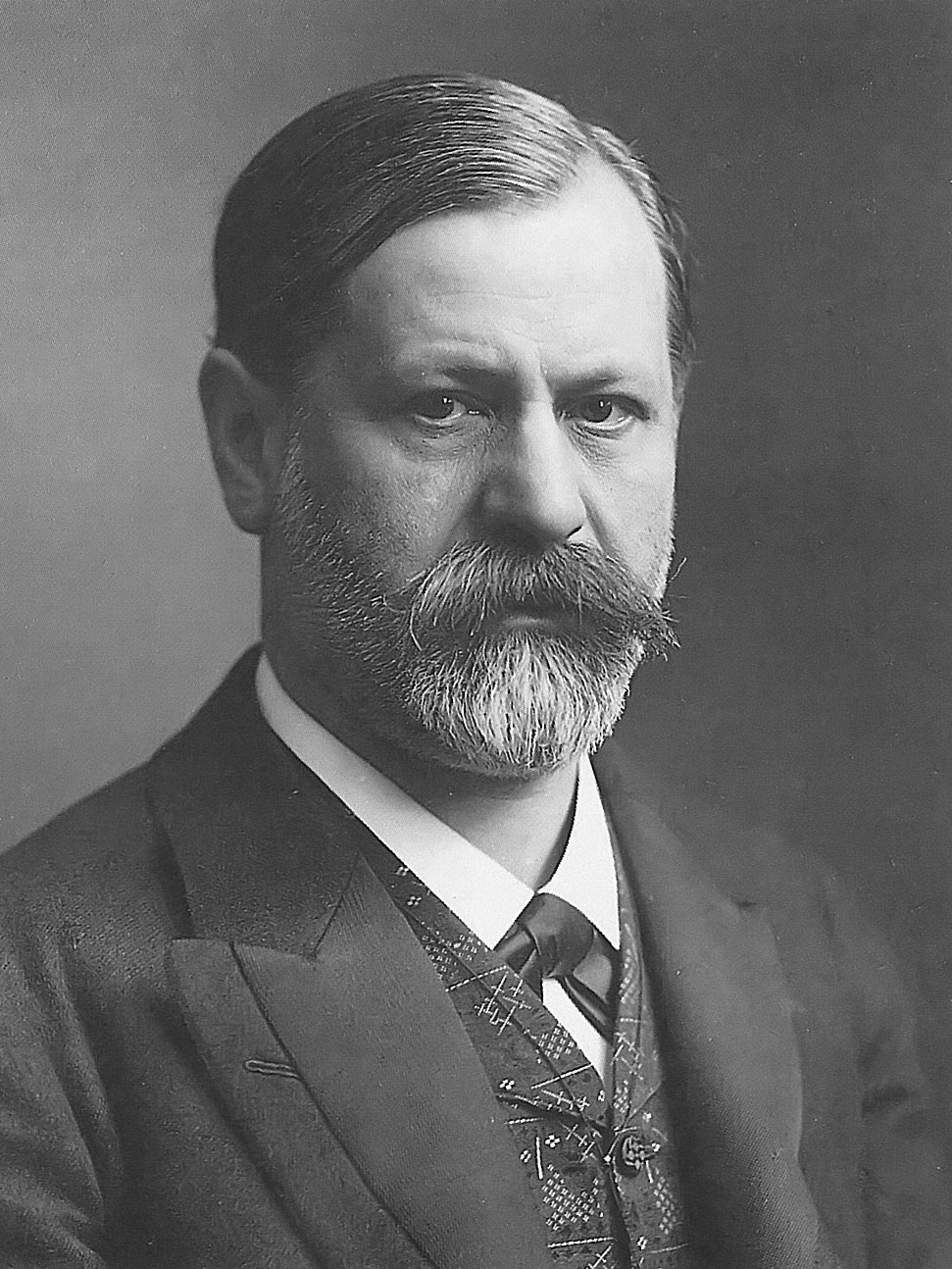
Sigmund Freud, founder of Psychoanalysis.

Freud's seduction theory (German: Verführungstheorie) was a hypothesis posited in the mid-1890s by Sigmund Freud that he believed provided the solution to the problem of the origins of hysteria and obsessional neurosis. According to the theory, a repressed memory of child sexual abuse in early childhood was the essential precondition for hysterical or obsessional symptoms, with the addition of an active sexual experience up to the age of eight for the latter.

In the traditional account of development of seduction theory, Freud initially thought that his patients were relating more or less factual stories of sexual mistreatment, and that only sexual abuse could be responsible for his patients' neuroses and other mental health problems. Within a few years Freud abandoned his theory, concluding that some of his patients' stories of sexual abuse were not literal and were instead fantasies. He never ruled out that sexual abuse could be the cause of illness, simply that it was not the only possible cause.

An alternative account that has come to the fore in recent Freudian scholarship emphasizes that the theory, as posited by Freud, was that hysteria and obsessional neurosis result from unconscious memories of sexual abuse in infancy. In the three seduction theory papers published in 1896, Freud stated that with all his current patients he had been able to uncover such abuse, mostly when they were below the age of four. These papers indicate that the patients did not relate stories of having been sexually abused in early childhood; rather, Freud interpreted his patients' symptoms and associations to indicate that they had, and exerted pressure on his patients, in an attempt to induce the "reproduction" of the deeply repressed memories he posited. Though he reported he had succeeded in achieving this aim, he also acknowledged that the patients generally remained unconvinced that what they had experienced indicated that they had actually been sexually abused in infancy. Freud's reports of the seduction theory episode went through a series of changes over the years, culminating in the traditional story based on his last account, in New Introductory Lectures on Psychoanalysis.

== Theory ==
On the evening of April 21, 1896, Sigmund Freud presented a paper before his colleagues at the Society for Psychiatry and Neurology in Vienna, entitled "The Aetiology of Hysteria". Using a sample of 18 patients—male and female—from his practice, he concluded that all of them had been the victims of sexual assaults by various caretakers. The cause of the patient's distress lay in a trauma inflicted by an actor in the child's social environment. The source of internal psychic pain lay in an act inflicted upon the child from outside. This led to his well-known "seduction theory".

The medical journals of that time did not report Freud's lecture. In the Wiener klinische Wochenschrift, published weekly in Vienna, on May 14, 1896, three papers were reported from the April 21 meeting (p. 420). Two of the papers were reported in the usual manner. Invariably, the practice was to give the title of a paper, a brief summary of its contents, and an account of the ensuing discussion. But in the citation of the last paper, there was a break with tradition. The report reads as follows: Docent Sigm. Freud: Über die Ätiologie der Hysterie (Sigmund Freud, lecturer: On the Aetiology of Hysteria.) There was no summary and no discussion. Freud published it a few weeks later in the Wiener klinische Rundschau.

On the other hand, Freud had no trouble publishing three papers on the subject in a matter of months. Doubt has been cast on the notion that the occurrence of child sexual abuse was not acknowledged by most of Freud's colleagues. It has been pointed out that they were skeptical about Freud's claims of one hundred percent confirmation of his theory and would have been aware of criticisms that his suggestive clinical procedures were liable to produce findings of doubtful validity.

Freud's seduction theory emphasizes the causative impact of nurture — the shaping of the mind by experience. This theory held that hysteria and obsessional neurosis are caused by repressed memories of infantile sexual abuse. Infantile sexual abuse, the root of all neurosis, is the premature introduction of sexuality into a child's experience. Trauma creates affects and thoughts that simply cannot be integrated. The adult who had a normal, non-traumatic childhood is able to contain and assimilate sexual feelings into a continuous sense of self. Freud proposed that adults who experienced sexual abuse as a child suffer from unconscious memories and feelings incompatible with the central mass of thoughts and feelings that constitute his or her experience. Psychic disorders are a direct consequence of experiences that cannot be assimilated. Infantile sexual abuse was a necessary condition for the development of certain disorders, hysteria in particular. But another condition had to be met: There had to be an unconscious memory of the abuse.

== Reported evidence ==
Freud had a lot of data as evidence for the seduction theory, but rather than presenting the actual data on which he based his conclusions (his clinical cases and what he had learned from them) or the methods he used to acquire the data (his psychoanalytic technique), he instead addressed only the evidence that the data he reportedly acquired were accurate (that he had discovered genuine abuse). He thought that the community could not yet handle the clinical case stories about sexual abuse. He did not want to present these stories before the seduction theory had become more accepted. Freud made several arguments to support the position that the memories he had uncovered were genuine. One of them was, according to Freud, that the patients were not simply remembering the events as they would normally forgotten material; rather they were essentially reliving the events, with all the accompanying painful sensory experiences.

On two occasions Freud wrote that he would be presenting the clinical evidence for his claims, but he never did so, which some critics have contended means that they have had to be taken largely on trust. Freud's clinical methodology at the time, involving the symbolic interpretation of symptoms, the use of suggestion and the exerting of pressure to induce his patients to "reproduce" the deeply repressed memories he posited, has led several Freud scholars and historians of psychology to cast doubt on the validity of his findings, whether of actual infantile abuse, or, as he later decided, unconscious fantasies. Frank Cioffi, for example, wrote, "the seduction stories were related by Freud to his patients, and not to Freud by his patients.... [B]efore Freud discovered that the seductions were imaginary he was describing them as experiences which his patients had no feeling of recollecting".

== Abandonment ==
Freud did not publish the reasons that led to his abandoning the seduction theory in 1897–1898. For these we have to turn to a letter he wrote to his confidant Wilhelm Fliess dated 21 September 1897.

1. First, he referred to his inability to "bring a single analysis to a real conclusion" and "the absence of complete successes" on which he had counted.
2. Second, he wrote of his "surprise that in all cases, the father, not excluding my own, had to be accused of being perverse" if he were to be able to maintain the theory; and the "realization of the unexpected frequency of hysteria... whereas surely such widespread perversions against children are not very probable."
3. Third, Freud referred to indications that, he argued, the unconscious is unable to distinguish fact from fiction. In the unconscious there is no sign of reality, so one cannot differentiate between the truth and the fiction invested with feeling.
4. Fourth, Freud wrote of his belief that in "deep-reaching psychosis, the unconscious memory does not break through [to the conscious], so the secret of the childhood experiences is not disclosed even in the most confused delirium." (In the same letter Freud wrote that his loss of faith in his theory would remain known only to himself and Fliess, and in fact he did not make known his abandonment of the theory publicly until 1906.)

The collapse of the seduction theory led in 1897 to the emergence of Freud's new theory of infantile sexuality. The impulses, fantasies and conflicts that Freud claimed to have uncovered beneath the neurotic symptoms of his patients derived not from only external contamination, but also from the mind of the child itself.

There were some serious negative consequences of this shift. The most obvious negative consequence was that a limited interpretation of Freud's theory of infantile sexuality would cause some therapists and others to deny reported sexual abuse as fantasy; a situation that has given rise to much criticism (e.g., The Freudian Coverup by Florence Rush and The Assault on Truth by Jeffrey Moussaieff Masson). However, the rejection of the seduction theory led to the development of concepts such as the unconscious, repressions, the repetition compulsion, transference and resistance, and the unfolding psychosexual stages of childhood.

In 1998, a century after Freud abandoned the Seduction Theory, a group of analysts and psychologists, including Stephen Mitchell, George Makari, Leonard Shengold, Jacob Arlow, and Anna Ornstein, met at Mount Sinai Hospital to reconsider the Seduction Theory, during which they discussed what any therapist can really know about their patients' true histories and whether that lack of certainty about the truth matters for treatment. Shengold called the meeting, "a Woodstock of epistemology." And the analyst Robert Michaels, defending psychoanalysts' lack of historical truth about their patients said, "We are experts not in helping patients learn facts but in helping them construct useful myths. We are fantasy doctors, not reality doctors."

== See also ==
- Jean Laplanche, psychoanalyst and theorist who took up Freud's abandoned theory and developed his théorie de la séduction généralisée in 1987
- Emma Eckstein
- Auguste Ambroise Tardieu, French medical doctor and one of the first to examine and report sexual abuse in children
- The Assault on Truth by Jeffrey Moussaieff Masson
- The Freudian Coverup by Florence Rush
- In the Freud Archives by Janet Malcolm
