= Florence Rush =

American activist (1918–2008)

- Born: January 23, 1918
- Died: December 9, 2008 (aged 90)
- Occupation: Social worker
- Notable work: The Sexual Abuse of Children: A Feminist Point of View

Florence Rush (23 January 1918 – 9 December 2008) was an American certified social worker (M.S.W. from the University of Pennsylvania), feminist theorist and organizer best known for introducing The Freudian Coverup in her presentation "The Sexual Abuse of Children: A Feminist Point of View", about childhood sexual abuse and incest, at the April 1971 New York Radical Feminists (NYRF) Rape Conference. Rush's paper at the time was the first challenge to Freudian theories of children as the seducers of adults rather than the victims of adults' sexual/power exploitation.

== Biography ==
Rush was born to Ashkenazi Russian-Jewish immigrants in Manhattan and grew up in The Bronx before moving to New Rochelle, New York. In "Growing Up Molested", the preface to her book The Best Kept Secret, Rush wrote that she "painfully remembered that I, despite the amenities of a middle-class upbringing, had also been sexually abused as a child." Rush's parents had fled a small town in Czarist Russia because her father was facing forced conscription into the Russian Army, as well as for reasons of antisemitism and poverty. Her family observed Shabbat and her parents worked in sweatshops on the Lower East Side until her father graduated from Brooklyn College and opened a drugstore. She subsequently moved to Manhattan's Greenwich Village in the early 1970s. She was married to Bernard Rush and is survived by son, Thomas, his two children, and daughter, Eleanor. In 2005, she was honored with the New York City NOW Chapter's Susan B. Anthony Award to grassroots feminists.

== Career ==
Rush observed the problem of childhood sexual abuse as a psychiatric social worker at the New York Society for the Prevention of Cruelty to Children and at a facility for delinquent female adolescents, although at the time—during the 1950s and 1960s—such therapists were instructed to avoid discussing incest with their young patients because of prevailing Freudian theories.

Rush's NYRF Rape Conference presentation about incest and childhood sexual abuse reviewed psychiatric and psychoanalytical literature from Freud to that time that attributed such problems to children's seduction of adults or erotic fantasies. She then linked these prevailing psychiatric theories about the child's instigation of or erotic fantasies about incest and sexual abuse to maintaining a climate for the political and psychological oppression of women. As Rush concluded in her presentation the "sexual abuse of children..is an unspoken but prominent factor in socializing and preparing the female to accept a subordinate role: to feel guilty, ashamed, and to tolerate through fear, the power exercised over her by men."

Rush subsequently authored the 1977 Freud and the Sexual Abuse of Children in the first volume of a feminist periodical, Chrysalis, and the 1980 Prentice Hall The Best Kept Secret: The Sexual Abuse of Children that additionally traced the toleration of sexual abuse of children to the beginnings of history. Her continued work to counter sexual abuse of women and children and the media imagery feminists believe propagates such abuse encompassed key roles in many organizations. She served as 1979 co-founder and 1979-1987 lecturer for Women Against Pornography, 1980–1985 chair of the National Organization for Women (NOW)'s New York City Chapter's Media Reform Committee, Board of Directors Member of New York Women Against Rape where she produced and exhibited a slide presentation on the increasing media eroticism of children, and member of the New York State Psychiatric Institute's Advisory Committee on the Treatment of Sexual Aggressors.

== Activism ==
Rush was an early participant in the second wave of U.S. feminism when, in 1970, she became co-founder and steering committee member of Older Women's Liberation (OWL). She was to conclude her feminist work between 2002 and 2005 as chair of New York City NOW's Older Women's Committee where she organized against Republican presidential and congressional efforts to reduce budget deficits by reining in Social Security and Medicare benefit costs.

Rush was also concerned about women's role definitions and expectations within families as author of “Women in the Middle”, the first article about sandwich generation women taking care of both children and elderly relatives, published in Notes from the Third Year and Radical Feminism. In the mid-1970s she produced and exhibited a slide show presentation "From Mother Goddess to Father Knows Best" about the depreciation of mothers from ancient mythology to 20th century media representations. As a mother struggling with the role of caretaker to her son, Matthew, and his lover, Ron, when they became ill with AIDS in 1987, Rush's organizing around feminist issues extended to mothers of AIDS patients as an active participant in a mothers' support group of the People With AIDS Coalition of New York. After Matthew and Ron died in 1990, she founded and participated in the first Bereavement Group for such mothers.

In 1977, Rush became an associate of the Women's Institute for Freedom of the Press (WIFP). WIFP is an American nonprofit publishing organization. The organization works to increase communication between women and connect the public with forms of women-based media.
