= Jeffrey Moussaieff Masson =

American author (born 1941)

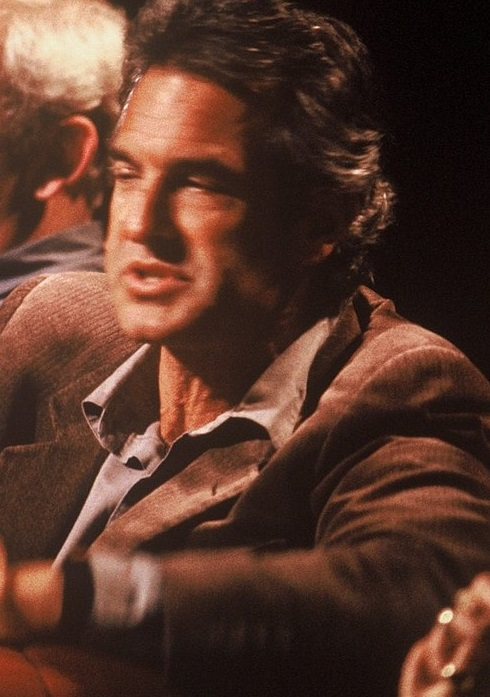
- Appearing in 1989 on the British TV discussion programme After Dark
- Born: Jeffrey Lloyd Masson; March 28, 1941 (age 85); Chicago, Illinois, U.S.
- Education: Harvard University
- Writing career
- Subject: Psychoanalysis
- Notable work: The Assault on Truth (1984)

Jeffrey Moussaieff Masson (/ˈmeɪsən/; born March 28, 1941, as Jeffrey Lloyd Masson) is an American author. Masson is best known for his conclusions about Sigmund Freud and psychoanalysis. In his The Assault on Truth (1984), Masson argues that Freud may have abandoned his seduction theory because he feared that granting the truth of his female patients' claims that they had been sexually abused as children would hinder the acceptance of his psychoanalytic methods. Masson is a veganism advocate and has written about animal rights.

== Early life ==
Jeffrey Masson is the son of Jacques Masson, a Frenchman of Bukharian Jewish ancestry, and Diana (Dina) Zeiger from an Ashkenazi Orthodox Jewish family. Masson's great-grandfather Shlomo Moussaieff was a kabbalist and founder of the Bukharian Quarter in Jerusalem. His grandfather Henry Mousaieff changed his family name from Moussaieff to Masson. Masson changed his middle name from Lloyd to Moussaieff.

Both of his parents were followers of the guru Paul Brunton. Masson's mother later became a follower of mystic and philosopher John Levy. During the 1940s and 1950s, Brunton often lived with them, eventually designating Masson as his heir apparent. In 1956, Diana and Jacques Masson moved to Uruguay because Brunton believed that a third world war was imminent. Jeffrey and his sister Linda followed in 1959.

=== Studies ===
At Brunton's urging, Masson went to Harvard University to study Sanskrit. While at Harvard, Masson became disillusioned with Brunton. Brunton and his influence on the Masson family form the subject of Masson's autobiographical book My Father's Guru: A Journey Through Spirituality and Disillusion. Harvard University granted Masson a B.A. magna cum laude in 1964 and a PhD with Honors in 1970. His degrees were in Sanskrit and Indian Studies. While undertaking his PhD, Masson also studied, supported by fellowships, at the École Normale Supérieure in Paris, the University of Calcutta, and the University of Poona.

== Career ==
Masson taught Sanskrit and Indian Studies at the University of Toronto, 1969–80, reaching the rank of Professor. From 1981 to 1992, he was a Research Associate, Department of South and Southeast Asian Studies, at the University of California, Berkeley. He was an Honorary Fellow in the Department of Philosophy at the University of Auckland. He later became Projects Director of the Sigmund Freud Archives and the author of numerous books, many about animals.

== Views on Freud's seduction theory ==
In 1970, Masson began studying to become a psychoanalyst at the Toronto Psychoanalytic Institute, completing a full clinical training course in 1978. His training analyst was Irvine Schiffer, a well-known Toronto analyst and author of books on the unconscious aspects of charisma and time. In 1990 Masson published an autobiographical book in which he accused Schiffer of cursing, being constantly late for sessions, and intimidating Masson when the latter complained about this issue. Schiffer denied it and debated Masson on the Canadian television program The Fifth Estate.

During this time, Masson befriended the psychoanalyst Kurt Eissler and became acquainted with Sigmund Freud's daughter Anna Freud. Eissler designated Masson to succeed him as Director of the Sigmund Freud Archives after his and Anna Freud's deaths. Masson learned German and studied the history of psychoanalysis. In 1980 Masson was appointed Projects Director of the Freud Archives, with full access to Freud's correspondence and other unpublished papers. While perusing this material, Masson concluded that Freud might have rejected the seduction theory in order to advance the cause of psychoanalysis and to maintain his own place within the psychoanalytic inner circle, after a hostile response from the renowned sex-pathologist Richard von Krafft-Ebing and the rest of the Vienna Psychiatric Society in 1896 — "an icy reception from the jackasses," was the way Freud described it later to Fliess.

In 1981, Masson's controversial conclusions were discussed in a series of New York Times articles by Ralph Blumenthal, to the dismay of the psychoanalytic establishment. Masson was subsequently dismissed from his position as project director of the Freud Archives and stripped of his membership in psychoanalytic professional societies. Masson was defended by Alice Miller and Muriel Gardiner ("While striving not to take sides," Gardiner said, "I consider him a good and energetic worker and a worthwhile scholar").

Masson later wrote several books critical of psychoanalysis, including The Assault on Truth: Freud's Suppression of the Seduction Theory. In the introduction to The Assault on Truth, Masson challenged his critics to address his arguments: "My pessimistic conclusions may possibly be wrong. The documents may in fact allow a very different reading." Janet Malcolm interviewed Masson at length when writing her long New Yorker article on this controversy ("Annals of Scholarship: Trouble in the Archives"), which she later expanded into In the Freud Archives, a book that also dealt with Eissler and with Peter Swales.

In 1984 Masson sued The New Yorker, Janet Malcolm, and the publisher Alfred A. Knopf for defamation, claiming that Malcolm had misquoted him. The ensuing trial drew considerable attention. The U.S. district court ruled against Masson. In 1989 the U.S. Court of Appeals for the Ninth Circuit in San Francisco upheld the lower court's decision. "The Court of Appeals affirmed ... [t]he court assumed for much of its opinion that Malcolm had deliberately altered each quotation not found on the tape recordings, but nevertheless held that petitioner failed to raise a jury question of actual malice." Masson petitioned the U.S. Supreme Court, which reversed the Court of Appeals decision and sent the case back to trial by jury. The decade-long ten-million-dollar federal lawsuit came to a close in 1994 when the jury and the court again ruled in The New Yorker's favor. Subsequent to the case, Janet Malcolm claimed to have found her handwritten notes indicating that Masson had lied in relation to the remaining disputed quotations, as he had lied in relation to quotations where there were recordings.

Meanwhile, in 1985, Masson edited and translated Freud's complete correspondence with Wilhelm Fliess after having convinced Anna Freud to make it available in full. He also looked up the original places and documents in La Salpêtrière Hospital in Paris, where Freud had studied with Charcot. Masson writes that the scientific community has been largely silent about his views, and that he suffered personal attacks once he deviated from the traditional views on the seduction theory and the history of psychoanalysis. Both the traditional view and Masson's case against it are built on the account that Freud's seduction theory patients reported having been sexually abused in early childhood; several Freud scholars have disputed this account.

== Later work ==
Since the early 1990s, Masson has written a number of books on the emotional life of animals, one of which, When Elephants Weep, has been translated into 20 languages. He has explained this radical change in the subject of his writings as follows:

I'd written a whole series of books about psychiatry, and nobody bought them. Nobody liked them. Nobody. Psychiatrists hated them, and they were much too abstruse for the general public. It was very hard to make a living, and I thought, As long as I'm not making a living, I may as well write about something I really love: animals.

In 2008, Masson became a Director of Voiceless, the animal protection institute. "We are not encouraged, on a daily basis, to pay careful attention to the animals we eat. On the contrary, the meat, dairy, and egg industries all actively encourage us to give thought to our own immediate interest (taste, for example, or cheap food) but not to the real suffering involved.... The animals involved suffer agony because of our ignorance. The least we owe them is to lessen that ignorance".

Masson also wrote a book about living in New Zealand, which includes an interview with Sir Edmund Hillary.

== Personal life ==
Masson is married to Leila Masson, a German pediatrician. They have two sons. He also has a daughter from a previous marriage with Therese Claire Masson. In the early 1990s, Masson had been engaged to University of Michigan feminist legal scholar Catharine MacKinnon, who wrote the preface to his A Dark Science: Women, Sexuality, and Psychiatry in the Nineteenth Century.

Masson became a vegan in 2004. He is an animal rights activist.

== Works ==
- 1974. "India and the Unconscious: Erik Erikson on Gandhi," International Journal of Psycho-Analysis 55: 519-26. Discussion by T. C. Sinha: 527.
- 1974. "Sex and Yoga: Psychoanalysis and the Indian Religious Experience", Journal of Indian Philosophy 2: 307–320. Reprinted in Vishnu on Freud's Desk: A Reader in Psychoanalysis and Hinduism, T.G. Vaidyanathan and Jeffrey J. Kripal, eds. Oxford University Press, ISBN 0-19-565835-3, Paperback (Edition: 2003)
- 1976. "Perversions — some observations", Israel Ann. Psychiat. rel. Disc., (1976b), 14, 354–61.
- 1976. (with Terri C. Masson) "The Navel of Neurosis: Trauma, Memory and Denial", paper presented to the San Francisco Psychoanalytic Society
- 1978. (with Terri C. Masson) "Buried Memories on the Acropolis. Freud's Relation to Mysticism and Anti-Semitism", International Journal of Psycho-Analysis 59: 199-208.
- 1980. The Oceanic Feeling: The Origins of Religious Sentiment in Ancient India.
- 1981. The Peacock's Egg: Love Poems from Ancient India, W. S. Merwin and J. Moussaieff Masson, eds. ISBN 0-86547-059-6
- 1984. The Assault on Truth: Freud's Suppression of the Seduction Theory. Farrar Straus & Giroux. ISBN 0-374-10642-8
- 1984. "Freud and the Seduction Theory: A challenge to the foundations of psychoanalysis," The Atlantic Monthly, February 1984.
- 1985. (editor and translator) The Complete Letters of Sigmund Freud to Wilhelm Fliess, 1887-1904. ISBN 0-674-15420-7
- 1986. A Dark Science: Women, Sexuality and Psychiatry in the Nineteenth Century. ISBN 0-374-13501-0
- 1988. Against Therapy: Emotional Tyranny and the Myth of Psychological Healing. ISBN 0-689-11929-1
- 1990. Final Analysis: The Making and Unmaking of A Psychoanalyst. Addison-Wesley. ISBN 0-201-52368-X
- 1993. My Father's Guru: A Journey Through Spirituality and Disillusion, Addison-Wesley. ISBN 0-201-56778-4
- 1994. (with Susan McCarthy) When Elephants Weep: The Emotional Life of Animals, Jonathan Cape.
- 1995. "A Note on U.G. Krishnamurti"
- 1996. Lost Prince: The Unsolved Mystery of Kaspar Hauser.
- 1997. Dogs Never Lie About Love: Reflections on the Emotional World of Dogs.
- 1999. The Emperor's Embrace: Reflections on Animal Families and Fatherhood.
- 2003. The Pig Who Sang to the Moon: The Emotional World of Farm Animals.
- 2002. The Nine Emotional Lives of Cats: A Journey Into the Feline Heart. ISBN 0-345-44882-0
- 2004. The Evolution of Fatherhood: A Celebration of Animal and Human Families.
- 2004. Slipping into Paradise: Why I Live in New Zealand. ISBN 0-345-46634-9
- 2004. The Cat Who Came in from the Cold. Wheeler. ISBN 1-58724-914-6
- 2005. Raising the Peaceable Kingdom: What Animals Can Teach Us about the Social Origins of Tolerance and Friendship.
- 2006. Altruistic Armadillos - Zen-Like Zebras: A Menagerie of 100 Favorite Animals. ISBN 978-0-345-47881-8
- 2009. The Face on Your Plate: The Truth about Food. ISBN 978-0-393-06595-4
- 2010. "On Alice Miller"
- 2010. The Dog Who Couldn't Stop Loving: How Dogs Have Captured Our Hearts for Thousands of Years. ISBN 978-0-06-177109-5
- 2010. (editor) Sigmund Freud: The Interpretation of Dreams: The Illustrated Edition. ISBN 978-1-4027-6388-5
- 2010 Altruistic Armadillos, Zenlike Zebras-Understanding the World's Most Intriguing Animals. Skyhorse Publishing. ISBN 1602397384
- 2010 The Wild Child: The Unsolved Mystery of Kaspar Hauser. ISBN 0-684-83096-5
- 2011 "Pornography and Animals", in Tankard Reist, Melinda; Bray, Abigail, eds. (2011). Big Porn Inc.: Exposing the Harms of the Global Pornography Industry. North Melbourne, Victoria: Spinifex Press. pp. 63–68. ISBN 9781876756895.
- 2014 Beasts: What Animals Can Teach Us About the Origins of Good and Evil. Bloomsbury Publishing. ISBN 978-1608196159
- 2020 Lost Companions: Reflections on the Death of Pets. Murdoch Books. ISBN 9781922351159

=== Reviews of his books ===
- The Complete Letters of Sigmund Freud to Wilhelm Fliess, 1887-1904: By William McGrath.
- Against Therapy:
  - By Jeanne Stubbs.
  - Herbert, Wray. "By Wray Herbert". Vol. 22, no. 10. Archived from the original on March 8, 2007 – via FindArticles.
- Final Analysis: By Michael Sacks.
- Tavris, Carol (October 21, 1990). "Breaking Away From the Cult". The New York Times.

== See also ==
- List of animal rights advocates
- List of vegans
