= Freud family =

Family of Sigmund Freud

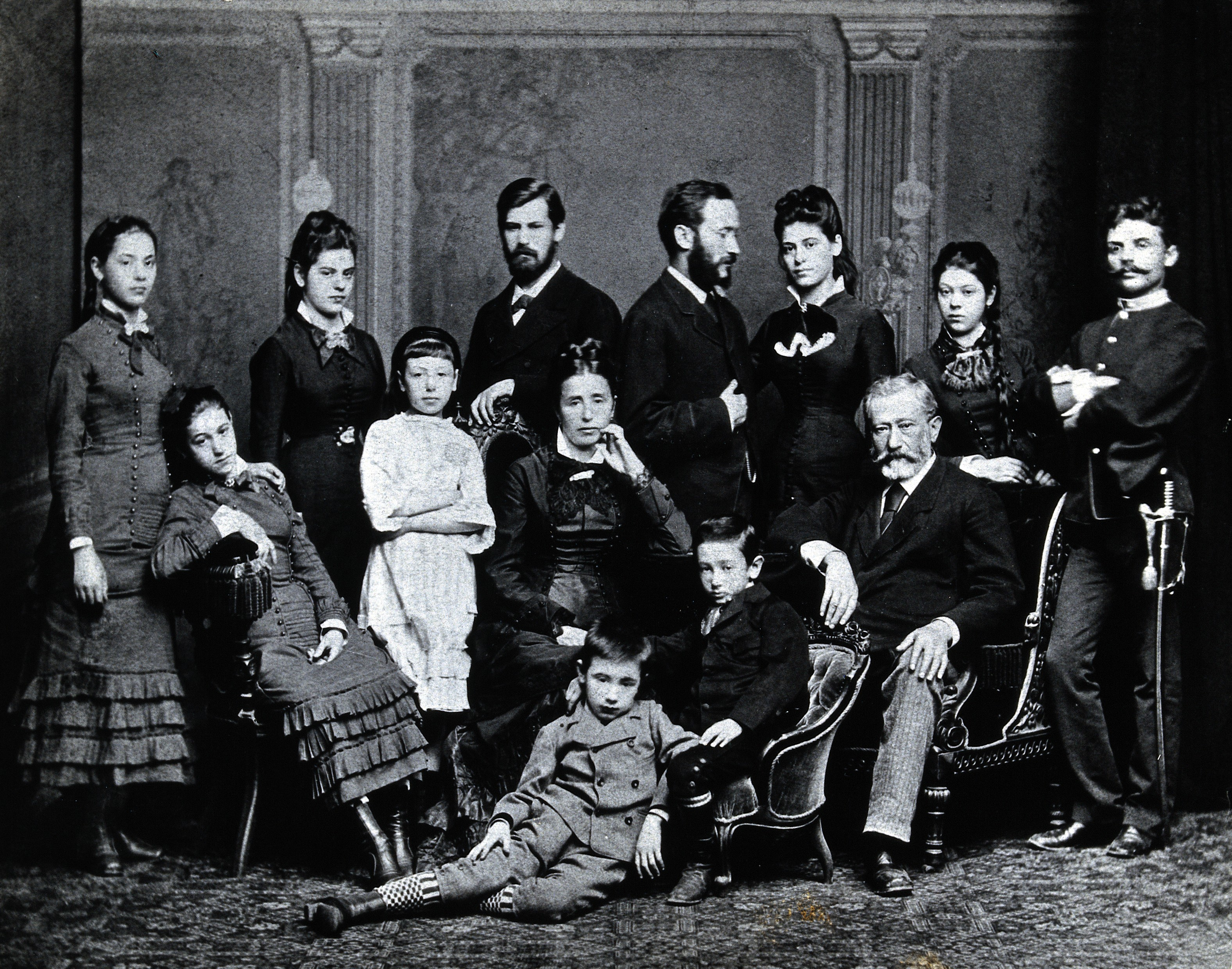
Freud family portrait, 1876 – standing left to right: Paula, Anna, an unidentified girl in a white dress, Sigmund, Emmanuel, Rosa, Marie, and their cousin Simon Nathanson; seated left to right: Adolfine, Amalia, an unidentified boy seated on the floor, Alexander in small chair, and Jacob Freud

The family of Sigmund Freud, the pioneer of psychoanalysis, lived in Austria and Germany until the 1930s before emigrating to England, Canada, and the United States. Several of Freud's descendants and relatives have become well known in different fields.

== Freud's parents and siblings ==
Sigmund Freud (1856–1939) was born to Jewish Galician parents in the Moravian town of Freiberg in Mähren, in what then was the Austrian Empire (now called Příbor and in the Czech Republic). He was the eldest child of Jacob Freud (1815–1896), a wool merchant, and his third wife, Amalia Nathansohn (1835–1930). Jacob Freud was born in Tysmenitz, then part of the Austrian Partition of Poland called the Kingdom of Galicia and Lodomeria (now called Tysmenytsia and in Ukraine), the eldest child of Schlomo and Peppi (Pessel), née Hoffmann, Freud. His two brothers, Abae (c. 1815–c. 1885) and Josef (1825–1897), had difficulties that concerned the family, the former because of his mentally incapacitated children, the latter because his business dealings came under criminal investigation.

Jacob Freud had two surviving children from his first marriage to Sally Kanner (1829–1852):

1. Emanuel (1832–1914)
2. Philipp (1836–1911)

Jacob's second marriage (1852–1855) to Rebecca (family of origin uncertain) was childless.

Amalia Freud was the daughter of Jacob Nathansohn (1805–1865) and Sara Wilenz born in Brody, then also part of the Kingdom of Galicia and Lodomeria and now also part of Ukraine. They later moved to Vienna. Her brother Hermann (1822–1895), who was a stockbroker in Odessa in the Russian Empire, was Freud's favourite uncle. She had three other brothers: Nathan (b. c.1825), Adolf (c.1830–1862) and Julius (1857–1858). Jacob and Amalia Freud had eight children:

Freud's mother, Amalia, in 1903

1. Sigmund (birth name Sigismund Schlomo; 6 May 1856 – 23 September 1939)
2. Julius (October 1857 – 15 April 1858)
3. Anna (31 December 1858 – 11 March 1955)
4. Regina Debora (nickname Rosa; 21 March 1860 – 1942)
5. Marie (nickname Mitzi; 22 March 1861 – 1942)
6. Esther Adolfine (nickname Dolfi; 23 July 1862 – 1942)
7. Pauline Regine (nickname Pauli; 3 May 1864 – 1943)
8. Alexander Gotthold Ephraim (19 April 1866 – 23 April 1943)

Julius Freud died in infancy.

Anna married Eli Bernays (1860–1921), the elder brother of Sigmund's wife Martha. There were four daughters: Judith (1885–1977), Lucy (1886–1980), Hella (1893–1994), Martha (1894–1979) and one son, Edward (1891–1995). In 1892 the family moved to the United States where Edward Bernays became a major influence in modern public relations. He married Doris E. Fleischman (1891–1980) who became known as a prominent feminist activist. Their daughters are Doris Bernays Held (b. 1929), a psychotherapist who married Richard Held (1922–2016) a neuroscientist, and Anne Bernays (b. 1930) a writer and editor, as was her husband, Justin Kaplan (1925–2014).

Rosa (Regina Deborah Graf-Freud) married a lawyer, Heinrich Graf (1852–1908). Their son, Hermann (1897–1917) was killed in the First World War; their daughter, Cäcilie (1899–1922), committed suicide after an unhappy love affair. In March or early April 1943 Rosa was transported from Vienna to the Treblinka extermination camp where she was murdered.

Mitzi (Marie Freud) married her cousin Moritz Freud (1857–1922). There were three daughters: Margarethe (1887–1981), Lily (1888–1970), Martha (1892–1930) and one son, Theodor (1904–1923) who died in a drowning accident. Martha, who was known as Tom, worked as a children's book illustrator. After the suicide of her husband, Jakob Seidmann, a journalist, she took her own life. Their daughter, Angela, was sent to live with relatives in Haifa. Lily became an actress and in 1917 married the actor Arnold Marlé. They subsequently adopted Angela. In July 1942 Mitzi was transported from Vienna to the Theresienstadt concentration camp. The following September she was transported to the Maly Trostinets extermination camp, near Minsk, where she was murdered.

Dolfi (Esther Adolfine Freud) did not marry and remained in the family home to care for her parents. In July 1942 Dolfi was transported from Vienna to the Theresienstadt concentration camp where she died of malnutrition on 29 September 1942.

Pauli (Pauline Regine Winternitz-Freud) married Valentine Winternitz (1859–1900) and emigrated to the United States where their daughter Rose Beatrice (1896–1969) was born. After the death of her husband she and her daughter returned to Europe. Rose (known as Rosi) married Ernst Waldinger, a poet, in 1923. They moved to New York City after the war where a daughter, Ruth, was born. In July 1942 Pauli was transported from Vienna to the Theresienstadt concentration camp. The following September she was transported to the Maly Trostinets extermination camp, near Minsk, where she was murdered.

Alexander Freud married Sophie Sabine Schreiber (1878–1970). They fled the Nazi regime in Austria with their son, Harry (1909–1968), and emigrated to Canada. Harry subsequently emigrated to the United States where he married Leli Margaret Horn.

Both Freud's half-brothers emigrated to Manchester, England, shortly before the rest of the Freud family moved to Vienna in 1860.

Emanuel Freud married Maria Rokachova (1836–1923) in Freiberg where their first three surviving children were born: Johann known as John (1855-1936), who was the "inseparable playmate" of Freud's early childhood, Pauline (1856–1944) and Bertha (1859-1940). Their other children were born in Manchester: Matilda (1862–1868), Harriet (1865–1868), Henrietta (1866 infant death) and Soloman (1870–1945, known as Sam). None of the children married. Research into the life of John has provided evidence that he moved to London and formed a partnership with Annie Newport (1868-1934) and had one child, Ethel Rose (1892-1959).

Philipp Freud married Bloomah Frankel (1838-1925). There were two children: Pauline (1873–1951) who married Fritz Hartwig (1881–1958); and Morris (1876-1938. Died in Port Elizabeth, South Africa). The death of the childless Pauline in 1951 marked the end of the Manchester Freuds.

Freud visited his half-brothers and their families in England twice, in 1875 while still a student, and again in 1908. He kept in touch through a regular correspondence with Sam Freud. They would eventually meet again in London in 1938.

== Persecution and emigration ==
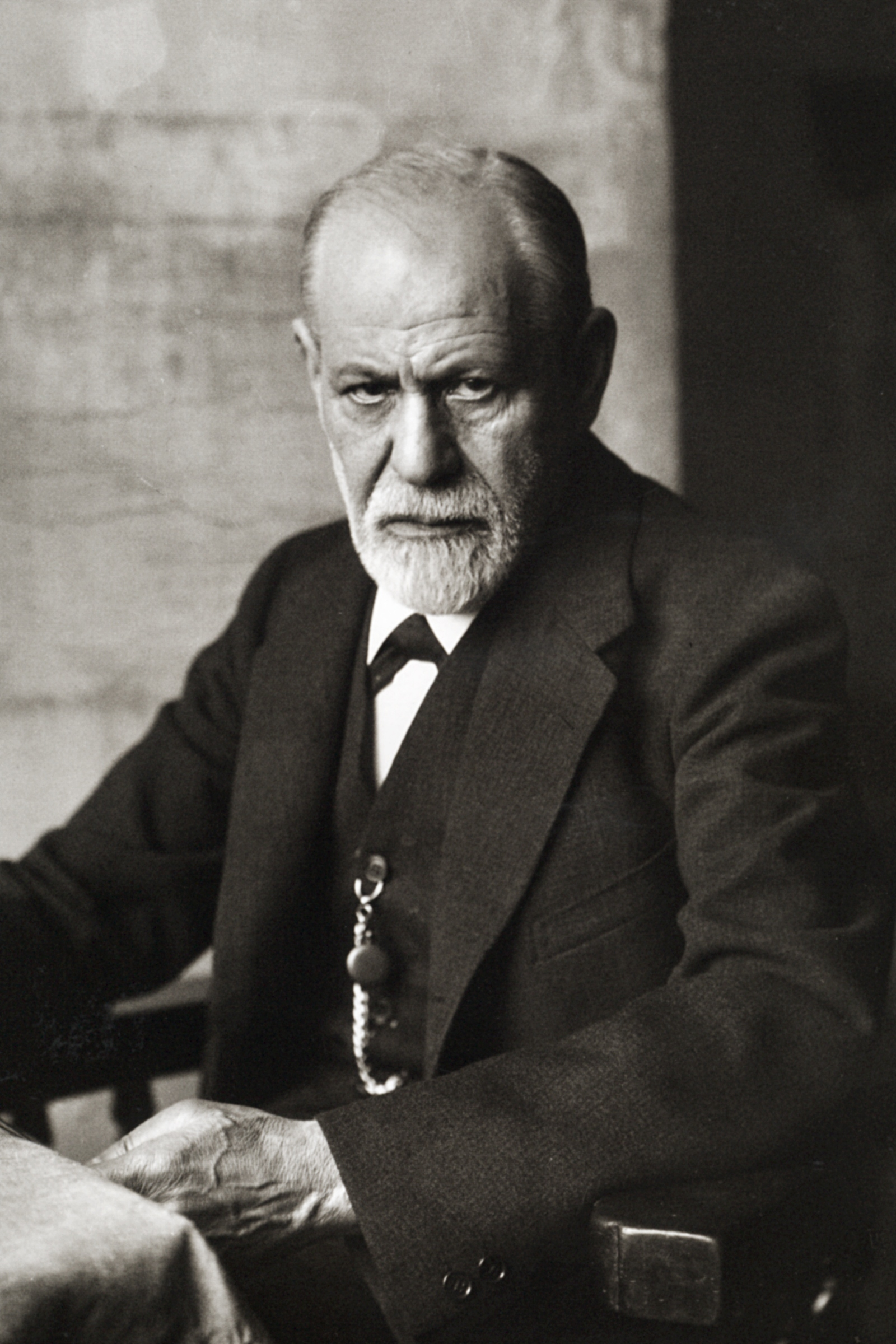
Sigmund Freud, 1926

The systematic persecution of Jews by Nazi Germany and the ensuing Holocaust had a profound effect on the family. Four of Freud's five sisters were murdered in concentration camps: in 1942 Mitzi Freud (eighty-one) and Paula Winternitz (seventy-eight) were transported to Theresienstadt and taken from there to the Maly Trostinets extermination camp, near Minsk, where they were murdered. In 1943 Dolfi Freud died in Theresienstadt of internal bleeding, probably due to advanced starvation and Rosa Graf (eighty-two) was deported to Treblinka, where she was murdered. Freud's brother, Alexander, escaped with his family to Switzerland shortly before the Anschluss and they subsequently emigrated to Canada. Freud's sons Oliver, a civil engineer, and Ernst Ludwig, an architect, lived and worked in Berlin until Hitler came to power in Germany in 1933 after which they fled with their families to France and England respectively. Oliver Freud and his wife later emigrated to the United States. Their daughter Eva Freud had remained in France and died there of an infection contracted during an abortion.

Freud and his remaining family left Nazi-occupied Vienna in 1938 after Ernest Jones, the then President of the International Psychoanalytic Association, secured immigration permits for them to move to Britain. Permits were also secured for Freud's housekeeper, Paula Fichtl, his doctor, Max Schur and his family, as well as a number of Freud's colleagues and their families. Freud's grandson, Ernst Halberstadt, was the first to leave Vienna on 28 March, initially for Paris, before going on to London where after the war he would adopt the name Ernest Freud and train as a psychoanalyst. Next to leave for Paris were Ernestine, Sophie and Walter Freud, the wife and children of Freud's eldest son, Martin. Walter went on to join his father in London. His mother and sister remained in France and subsequently emigrated to the United States. His maternal grandmother, Ida Drucker, was deported from Biarritz in 1942 and murdered in Auschwitz.

Freud's sister-in-law, Minna Bernays, was the first to leave for London early in May 1938. She was followed by his son, Martin, on 14 May and then by his daughter Mathilde and her husband, Robert Hollitscher, on 24 May. Freud, his wife and daughter, Anna, left Vienna on 4 June on the Orient Express, accompanied by their housekeeper Paula Fichtl and Dr Josephine Stross. Stross was a late replacement as medical supervisor for Freud, summoned after his physician Max Schur became incapacitated by appendicitis. They arrived in Paris the following day, staying at the home of Marie Bonaparte before boarding the night train to London via Calais. Their arrival at Victoria Station on the morning of 6 June attracted widespread press coverage. Freud's architect son, Ernst, arranged temporary accommodation for the Freuds in north London at 39 Elsworthy Road before the new family home was established in Hampstead at 20 Maresfield Gardens in September 1938. Ernst designed modifications of the building including the installation of an electric lift. The study and library areas were arranged to create the atmosphere and visual impression of Freud's Vienna consulting rooms.

== War years ==
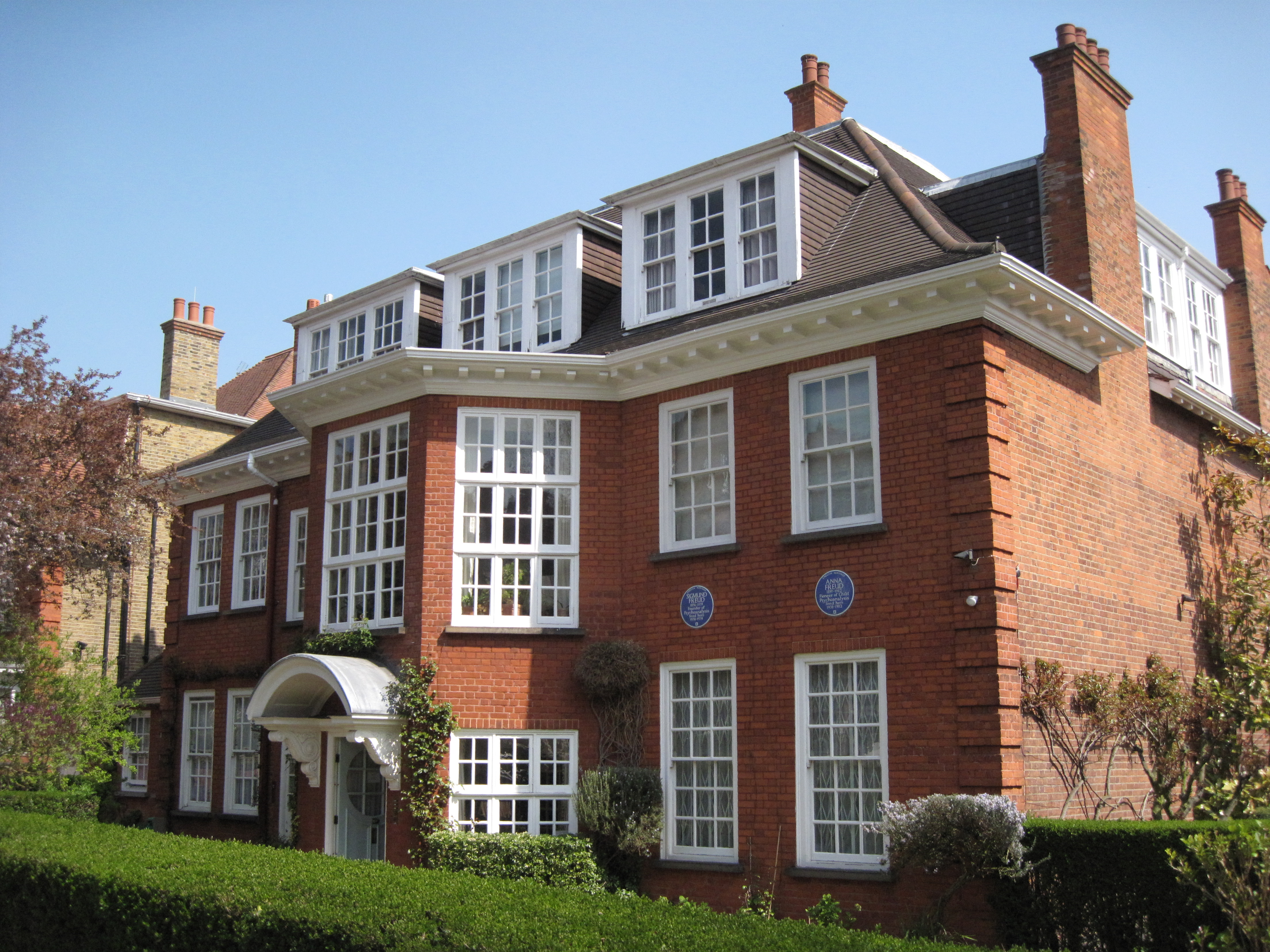
Sigmund Freud's last home, 20 Maresfield Gardens, London, now the Freud Museum

After Sigmund Freud's death in 1939, Martha and Anna Freud made their home available to relatives and friends fleeing the Nazi occupation of Europe. In 1941, following the death of Martha's sister, Minna, Dorothy Burlingham (1891–1979) became a permanent member of the household. From their first meeting in Vienna in 1925, Anna and Dorothy developed "intimate relations that closely resembled those of lesbians", although Anna "categorically denied the existence of a sexual relationship". Dorothy had been a patient of Freud's and her four children, Bob, Mary (Mabbie), Katrina, and Michael, were among the first of Anna's after she had begun her own psychoanalytic practice. During and after the war they collaborated in establishing the Hampstead War Nursery that provided therapy and residential care for children whose lives had been disrupted by the war. Their work laid the foundations for the post-war Hampstead Child Therapy Course and Clinic, founded in 1952 (later renamed the Anna Freud National Centre for Children and Families).

Martin and Walter Freud were both interned in 1940 as enemy aliens. Following a change in government policy on internment, both were subsequently recruited to the Pioneer Corps. After the war, denied recognition as a (Vienna-trained) lawyer by the British legal profession, Martin Freud ran a tobacconist shop in Bloomsbury. His autobiographical memoir of Freud family life in Vienna, Glory Reflected: Sigmund Freud - the Man and Father, was published in 1957. His sister, Mathilde Höllischer, opened 'Robell', a women's fashion store on Baker Street.

Walter Freud was deported to an internment camp in New South Wales, Australia. On his return to England in 1941 he was recruited to the Pioneer Corps and subsequently to the SOE. In April 1945 he was parachuted behind enemy lines in Austria. Advised to change his name in case of capture, he refused, declaring : "I want the Germans to know a Freud is coming back". He narrowly survived separation from his comrades and took the leading role in securing the surrender of the strategically important Zeltweg aerodrome in southern Austria. When the war ended he was assigned to war crimes investigation work in Germany. Given the fate of his great aunts and maternal grandmother at the hands of the Nazis, he was particularly pleased to help secure the prosecution of directors of the firm that supplied Zyklon B gas to the concentration camps, two of whom were executed for war crimes. In 1946, he left the army with the rank of major. The following year he was granted British citizenship and resumed a career as an industrial chemist.

Retribution for the murder of his aunts was also a concern for Alexander Freud's son, Harry. He arrived in post-war Vienna as a U.S. army officer to investigate the circumstances of their deportation and helped track down and bring before the courts Anton Sauerwald, the Nazi commissar charged with the supervision of the Freuds' assets. Sauerwald gained early release from prison in 1947 when, at the request of his wife, Anna Freud intervened on his behalf, revealing that he had, by concealing evidence of Freud's Swiss bank account, "used his office as our appointed commissar in such a manner as to protect my father".

Ernst Freud and his three sons, Stephan, Clement and Lucian, were spared the ordeal of internment but only through the intervention of his father's close friend and colleague Princess Marie Bonaparte. His numerous attempts to secure naturalisation status for the family since their arrival in the UK in 1933 had met without success and, with preparations for war in place, by 1939 the government had banned all German citizens from the process. Bonaparte was in London to visit his ailing father who advised her of the problem. She took advantage of her royal family connections to persuade her relative, Prince George, Duke of Kent, to intervene with the immigration authorities and this secured the prompt issue of naturalisation documentation in September 1939. Stephan and Clement Freud served in the army during the war. Lucian gained exemption from conscription due to ill-health. He had voluntarily enlisted into the Merchant Navy in 1941 and was discharged on his return from a trans-Atlantic crossing in a poor physical state.

After the war Ernst resumed his architectural practice, Stephan worked in publishing and subsequently ran a hardware store near Baker Street, Lucian became well known as an artist, Clement as a broadcaster, journalist and MP. Ernst took over management of the copyright negotiations for the publishing of his father's works and, after retiring from his architectural practice, he worked on arrangements for publishing his father's voluminous correspondence in collaboration with Anna Freud. In accordance with Freud's wishes his grandchildren were the beneficiaries of royalties from his published works. Ernst Freud had also begun the adoption of the Suffolk seaside village of Walberswick as a favoured holiday destination for the Freuds, purchasing and renovating a property there in 1938. A succession of Freuds purchased holiday homes there, including Anna and Clement Freud, his daughter Emma Freud and her cousin Esther Freud.

== Sigmund Freud's children and descendants ==
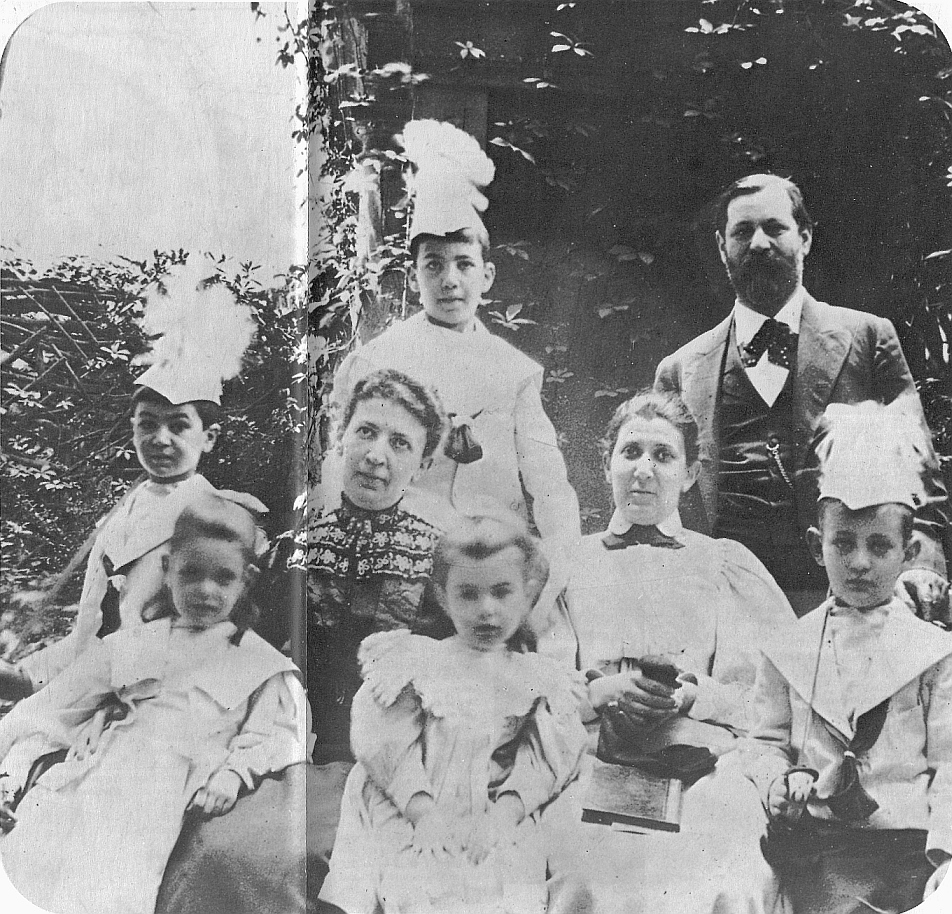
Sigmund Freud's family in 1898 - front row: Sophie, Anna, and Ernst Freud; middle row: Oliver and Martha Freud, Minna Bernays; back row: Martin and Sigmund Freud. Mathilde, the eldest child, is not included.

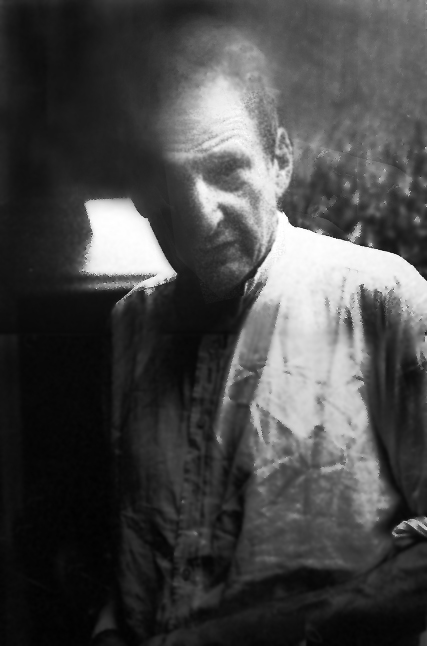
Lucian Freud

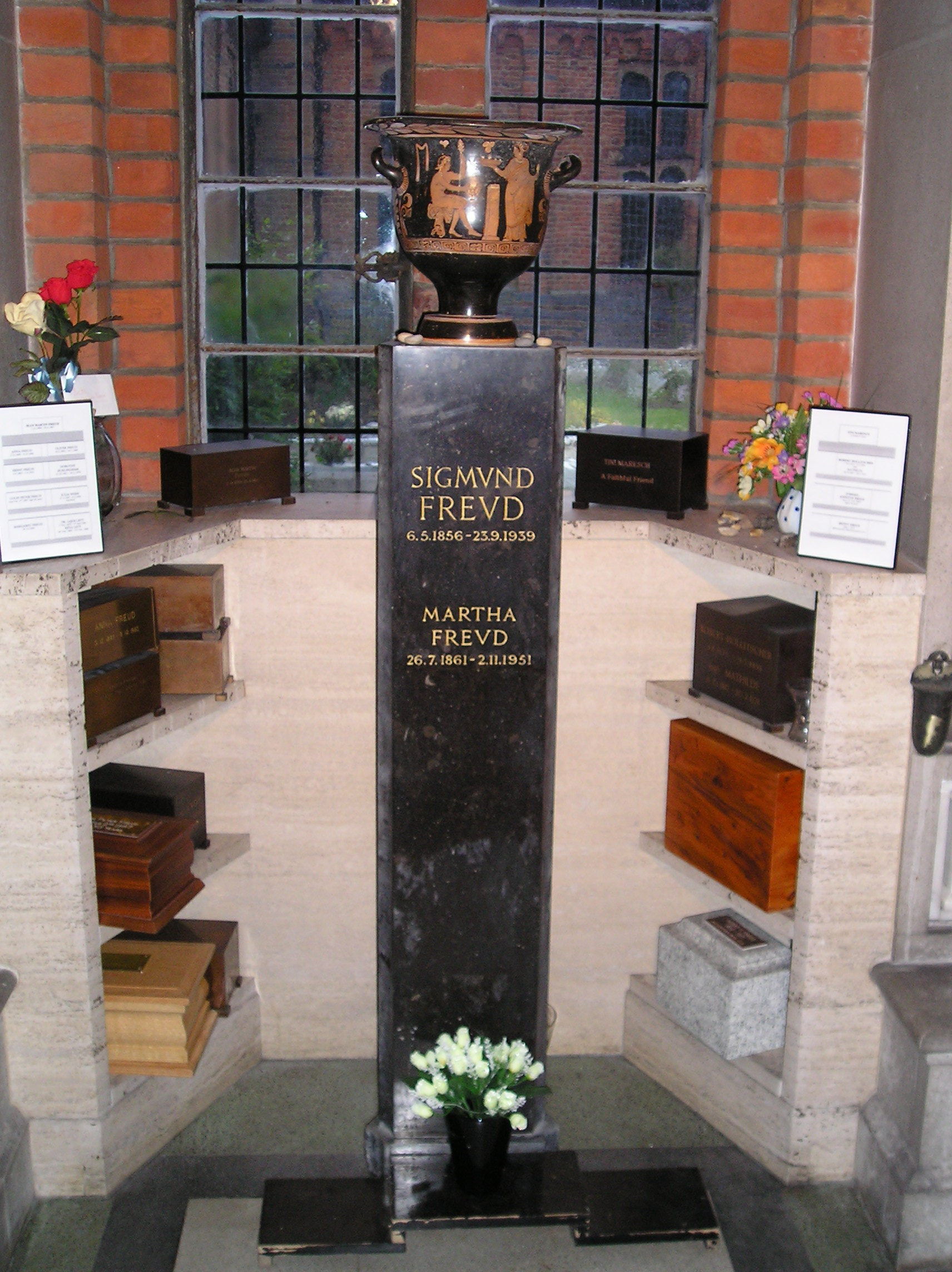
Freud Corner at Golders Green Crematorium, North London, where Sigmund Freud and many members of his family are buried

Sigmund Freud married Martha Bernays (1861–1951) in 1886. Martha was born in Hamburg, the daughter of Berman Bernays (1826–1879), a businessman, and Emmeline Philipp (1830–1910). Her grandfather, Isaac Bernays (1792–1849), was a Chief Rabbi of Hamburg. Two of her uncles were prominent academics: Jakob Bernays (1824–1881) was a professor of classics at the University of Bonn; Michael Bernays (1834–1897) was a professor of German literature at LMU Munich. In 1869, the Bernays family moved to Vienna where Berman Bernays became secretary to the economist Lorenz von Stein. After his sudden death in 1879, his post was taken over by his son Eli while Martha and her mother moved back to Hamburg. In 1883, Eli married Freud's oldest sister Anna. Martha's sister, Minna Bernays (1865–1941), became a permanent member of the Freud household after the death of her fiancé in 1895.

Sigmund and Martha Freud had six children and eight grandchildren:

1. Mathilde Freud (1887–1978) married Robert Hollitscher (1875–1959), and had no children
2. Jean-Martin Freud (1889–1967, known as Martin Freud) married Ernestine (Esti) Drucker (1896–1980), and had two children:
  1. Anton Walter Freud (1921–2004) married Annette Krarup (1925–2000) and had three children
    1. David Freud (born 1950, later Lord Freud), married Cilla Dickinson and had three children:
      1. Andrew Freud
      2. Emily Freud
      3. Juliet Freud
    2. Ida Freud (born 1952), married M. Fairbairn
    3. Caroline Freud (born 1955), married L. Penney
  2. Sophie Freud (1924–2022), married Paul Loewenstein (1921–1992) and had three children:
    1. Andrea Freud Loewenstein
    2. Dania Loewenstein, married S. Jekel
    3. George Loewenstein
3. Oliver Freud (1891–1969), married (i) Ella Haim; (ii) Henny Fuchs (1892–1971). From his marriage to Henny Fuchs, he had one child:
  1. Eva Freud (1924–1944)
4. Ernst L. Freud (1892–1970), married Lucie Brasch (1896–1989), and had three children:
  1. Stephan Gabriel Freud (1921–2015, known as Stephen Freud) married (i) Lois Blake (born 1924); (ii) Christine Ann Potter (born 1927). From his marriage to Lois Blake, he had one child:
    1. Dorothy Freud
  2. Lucian Michael Freud (1922–2011), married (i) Kathleen Garman (1926–2011), two children; (ii) Lady Caroline Blackwood (1931–1996). He also had four children by Suzy Boyt, four by Katherine McAdam (died 1998), two by Bernardine Coverley (died 2011), one by Jacquetta Eliot, Countess of St. Germans and one by Celia Paul. His children include:
    1. Annie Freud (born 1948)
    2. Annabel Freud (born 1952)
    3. Alexander Boyt (born 1957)
    4. Jane McAdam Freud (1958–2022)
    5. Paul McAdam Freud (born 1959)
    6. Rose Boyt (born 1959), married Mark Pearce; two children
    7. Lucy McAdam Freud (born 1961), married Peter Everett; two children
    8. Bella Freud (born 1961), married James Fox; one child
    9. Isobel Boyt (born 1961)
    10. Esther Freud (born 1963), married David Morrissey; three children: Anna, Albie and Gene
    11. David McAdam Freud (born 1964), four children, partner of Debbi Mason
    12. Susie Boyt (born 1969), married to Tom Astor; two children
    13. Francis Michael Eliot (born 1971)
    14. Frank Paul (born 1984), three children
  3. Clemens Rafael Freud (1924–2009, later Sir Clement Raphael Freud), married June Flewett (stage name Jill Raymond) in 1950 and had five children:
    1. Nicola Freud (born 1951), married to Richard Allen, had five children:
      1. Tom Freud (born 1973)
      2. Jack Freud (born 1980), married to Kate Melhuish
      3. Martha Freud (born 1983), partner of Adam Smith
      4. Max Freud (born 1986)
      5. Harry Freud (born 1986)
    2. Dominic Freud (born 1956), married Patty Freud, and had three children.
    3. Emma Freud (born 1962), married to Richard Curtis, and had four children, including Scarlett Curtis.
    4. Matthew Freud (born 1963), married: (i) Caroline Hutton, and had two children; (ii) Elisabeth Murdoch, and had two children
    5. Ashley Freud (adopted nephew)
5. Sophie Freud (1893–1920, died in the inter-war influenza epidemic), married Max Halberstadt (1882–1940), and had two children:
  1. Ernst Halberstadt (1914–2008, also known as Ernest Freud) married Irene Chambers (born 1920), and had one child:
    1. Colin Peter Freud (1956–1987)
  2. Heinz Halberstadt (1918–1923, also known as Heinele, died from tuberculosis)
6. Anna Freud (1895–1982)

== See also ==
- Freud Corner (Golders Green Crematorium), where Sigmund Freud and many members of his family are buried

== Bibliography ==
- Benveniste, Daniel (2015) The Interwoven Lives of Sigmund, Anna, and W. Ernest Freud: Three Generations of Psychoanalysis New York: IPBooks
- Clark, Ronald W. (1980). Freud: the Man and His Cause. London: Jonathan Cape.
- Cohen, David (2009). The Escape of Sigmund Freud. London: JR Books.
- Feaver, William (2018). The Lives of Lucian Freud, Vol.1. London: Bloomsbury.
- Fry, Helen (2009). Freuds' War. Stroud: The History Press.
- Jones, Ernest (1953). Sigmund Freud: Life and Work: Vol 1: The Young Freud 1856–1900. London: Hogarth Press.
- Roudinesco, Elizabeth (2016). Freud: In His Time and Ours. Cambridge, Massachusetts: Harvard University Press.
- Welter, Volker (2012). Ernst L. Freud, Architect. New York: Berghahn Books. ISBN 978-0-85745-233-7.
- Willoughby, Roger (2025). Freud's British Family: Reclaiming Lost Lives in Manchester and London. Abingdon, Oxon: Routledge. ISBN 9781032651989.
- Young-Bruehl, Elizabeth (2008). Anna Freud. Yale University Press.
