= Ernst L. Freud =

Austrian architect (1892–1970)

- Born: 6 April 1892; Vienna, Austria-Hungary
- Died: 7 April 1970 (aged 78); London, England
- Resting place: Freud Corner (Golders Green Crematorium)
- Occupation: Architect
- Spouse: Lucie Brasch
- Children: 3, including Lucian and Clement
- Parents: Sigmund Freud (father); Martha Bernays (mother)
- Relatives: Freud family

Ernst Lucie Freud (/frɔɪd/ FROYD; Austrian German: [frɔʏt]; 6 April 1892 – 7 April 1970) was an Austrian-born British architect and the fourth child of Austrian psychoanalyst Sigmund Freud and his German-born wife Martha Bernays. In honour of his wife, Lucie Brasch, he added the initial L. to his name when he married, making the middle initial stand for Lucie.

== Life ==
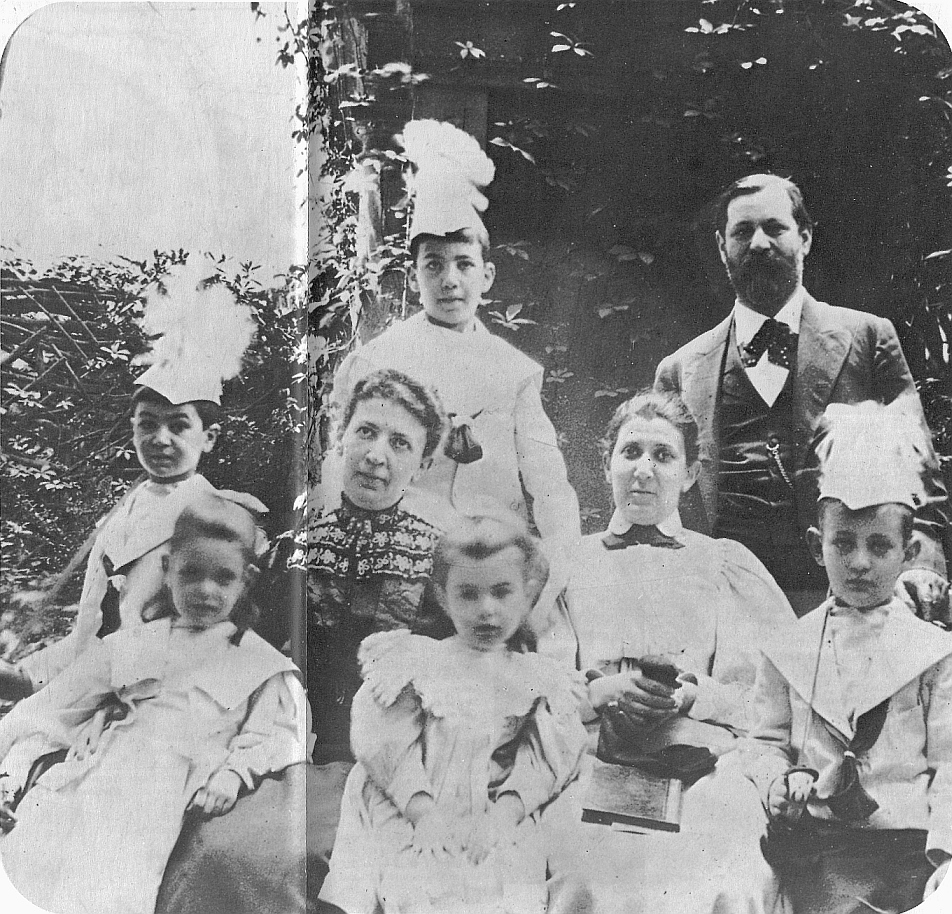
Ernst Freud (front right) at age six, c. 1898.

Freud was born in Vienna. In 1920, he established his practice in Berlin, where a large number of his clients were doctors. The majority of his commissions were for houses and consulting rooms and he worked in an Art Deco style but by 1930 had begun to work in a modern style showing the influence of Mies van der Rohe. Examples of this include a cigarette factory in Berlin and a house for Dr. Frank in Geltow near Potsdam. Dr. Frank was a manager of Deutsche Bank until he was forced to give up his position in 1933 and into exile in 1938.

In 1933, with the rise to power of the Nazis, Ernst Freud left Berlin for London where he settled in St. John's Wood. He secured a number of commissions for private houses and blocks of flats around Hampstead including the notable Frognal Close in 1938, Belvedere Court, Lyttelton Road and a consulting room for Melanie Klein. Ernst Freud, his wife and children were naturalised British subjects at the end of August 1939.

In 1938, Ernst Freud's parents and younger sister Anna Freud joined the family in London and moved into a house in Hampstead that Ernst remodelled including the creation of a glazed garden room. The house today is the Freud Museum. After Sigmund Freud's death in 1939, Ernst Freud organised the funeral arrangements at the Golders Green Crematorium, with Harrods as funeral directors. Ernst Freud also later designed the marble plinth on which Sigmund Freud's urn was placed.

For the last three years of his life, following a heart attack that forced his retirement as an architect, Freud devoted his time to editing his father's correspondence, a project that had long been his spare-time occupation. He was the editor of "Letters of Sigmund Freud", published in New York in 1960, and he was co-editor of "Psychoanalysis and Faith The Letters of Sigmund Freud and Oskar Pfister", published in New York in 1964.

== Personal life ==
Freud married Lucie Brasch, daughter of Joseph Brasch, a wealthy Berlin corn merchant. Lucie had studied classical philology in Berlin and Munich, as well as art history with Heinrich Wölfflin in Munich. To honour his wife, Ernst Freud added the middle initial L, for Lucie, to his name. Ernst and Lucie had three sons: Stephen Gabriel Freud (1921–2015), an ironmonger; the painter Lucian Freud (1922–2011), who was named after his mother; and the politician and broadcaster Clement Freud (1924–2009).

Clement Freud wrote a memoir in which, according to journalist Harriet Lane, "there are a few moments when indignation or irritation surge to the surface. In conversation, he is prepared to go further. In the book, for instance, he fudges his parents' non-appearance at his 1950 church wedding to actress Jill Raymond (who now runs two theatre companies in Suffolk). My interpretation had been that they had not been invited. But he corrects me on this. They were asked but chose, as atheists, not to attend."

Ernst Freud is buried in the "Freud Corner" at Golders Green Crematorium, London.

He died one day after his 78th birthday.

== See also ==
- Freud family
