= Walter Freud =

British chemical engineer (1921–2004)

Anton Walter Freud
- Born: 3 April 1921; Vienna, Austria
- Died: 8 February 2004 (aged 82); Oxted, Surrey, England
- Resting place: Golders Green Crematorium, London
- Education: Loughborough College
- Occupation: Chemical engineer
- Years active: 1946–1977
- Employer: BP Chemicals
- Spouse: Annette Krarup
- Children: 3, including David Freud
- Relatives: Freud family
- Military career
- Allegiance: United Kingdom
- Branch: British Army
- Service years: 1941–1946
- Rank: Major
- Service number: 328165
- Units: Royal Pioneer Corps; Special Operations Executive
- Conflicts: World War II

Anton Walter Freud (3 April 1921 – 8 February 2004) was a chemical engineer and a member of the Royal Pioneer Corps and the British Special Operations Executive. He was a grandson of Sigmund Freud and escaped with him and other family members from Vienna after the Anschluss.

== Life ==
Freud was born in Vienna in 1921. He was the first child of Sigmund Freud’s eldest son Jean-Martin (Martin), a lawyer, and his wife Ernestine Drucker. He was named after Anton von Freund, a colleague of his grandfather.

After leaving Vienna in March 1938, Freud's parents separated, and he and his father went to Britain whilst his mother and sister Sophie went to Paris before emigrating to the USA. While he was a student at Loughborough College, he and his father were interned as enemy aliens in May 1940. He was first held in a prison in Leicester and then on the Isle of Man. In July, he was deported to Australia aboard the HMT Dunera.

He was allowed to return to the United Kingdom in October 1941 due to a refinement in internment policy. He then joined the Royal Pioneer Corps in which he worked for eighteen months, before he was allowed to join the Special Operations Executive in 1943, due in part to his being a native German speaker. In April 1945 he parachuted into Styria in the Austrian Alps to help establish a British presence in advance of the approaching Red Army. Though he became separated from his comrades, he managed to bluff his way into the strategically important Zeltweg airfield. Posing as a representative of the advancing British Eighth Army, he convinced the Commandant to surrender it to the Allied forces.

After the war ended, Freud was posted to the War Crimes Investigation Unit. He was the first person to interrogate Bruno Tesch, head of Tesch & Stabenow, the firm responsible for supplying much of the Zyklon B gas used in Nazi extermination camps, which led to his trial and execution for war crimes. He was also involved in the investigation of Alfried Krupp of Krupp Industries, subsequently indicted for the use of slave labor, and in the investigation of the murder of twenty Jewish children, the subject of medical experimentation by the Nazi doctor Kurt Heissmeyer, in the basement of the Bullenhuser Damm school in Hamburg. In January 1946 he was sent to Denmark to track down and investigate a suspected Nazi war criminal, Gustav Jepsen, subsequently tried and hanged for his crimes. It was in Copenhagen that he met his future wife, Annette Krarup, a Danish civil servant. They married in August 1947, Freud having left active service with the rank of Major in September 1946.

After naturalising as a British subject in January 1947, Freud returned to Loughborough, where he graduated with a degree in chemical engineering. He was hired by British Oxygen Corporation, then went to work for British Nylon Spinners in Pontypool. He was recruited by British Hydrocarbons based in London in 1957, which after a series of mergers became part of BP Chemicals, where he remained until his retirement at the age of 55 in 1977.

In 1994 he returned to Vienna for the first time since his enforced exile as a guest of the Austrian government, which marked his achievement in liberating the Zeltweg airfield by hosting a dinner in his honour. His last residence in Britain was in Oxted, Surrey. Walter Freud and his wife are buried in the "Freud Corner" at Golders Green Crematorium, London.

In 2022 Spiegel TV produced a docu-drama based on Freud's work with the War Crimes Investigation Unit: Nazijäger – Reise in die Finsternis.

== See also ==
- Freud family
