= Paul Freud =

British painter (born 1959)

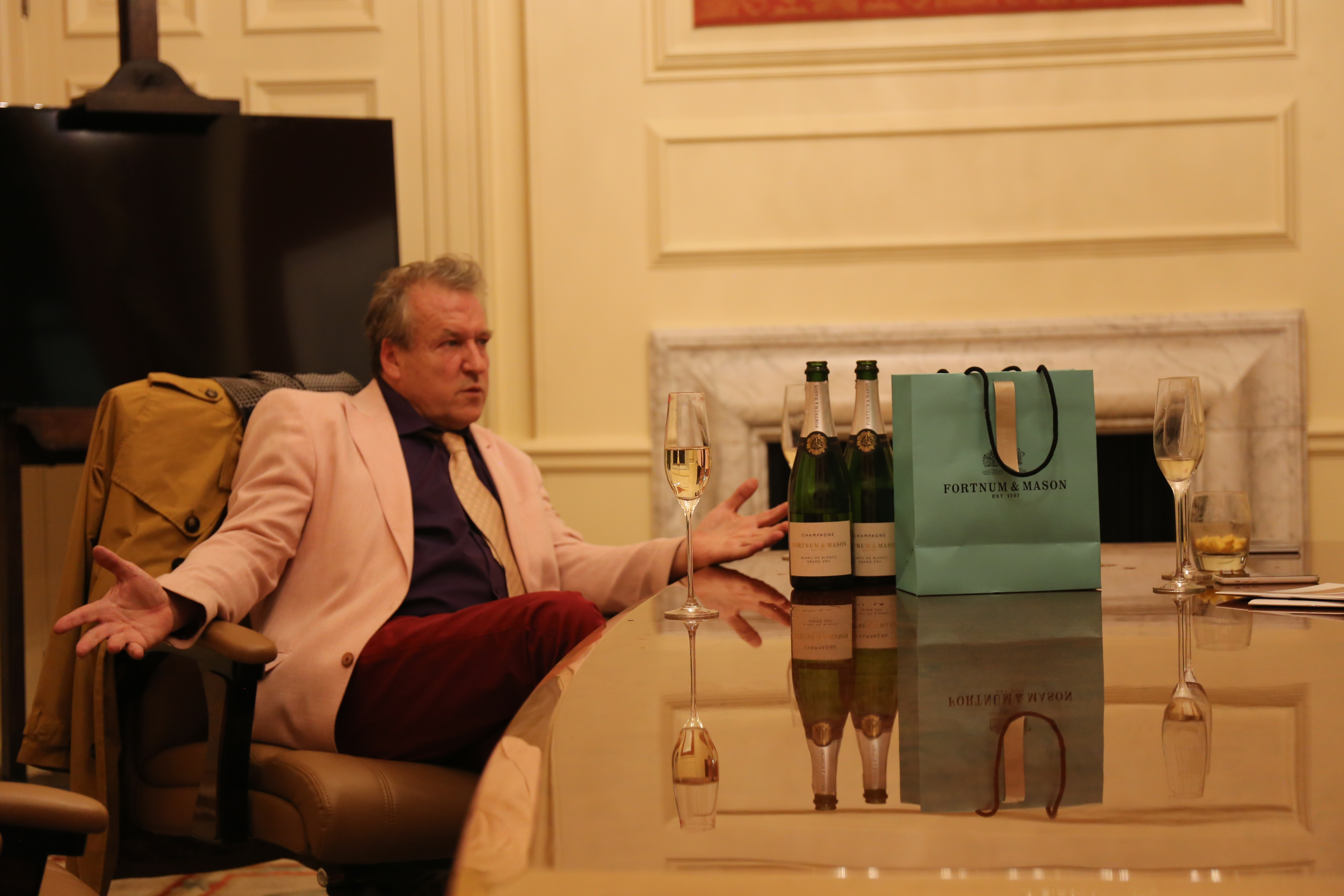
- Paul Freud discusses his exhibition The Edge of Abstraction with The Times Diary at Alinea, The Royal Exchange
- Born: 7 April 1959 (age 67); London, England
- Education: Camberwell College of Art, London, Goldsmiths, London,
- Known for: Painting
- Movement: Abstract Figurative Art

Paul Freud (born 7 April 1959) is a British painter.

== Early life and family ==
Paul Freud, the first son of Lucian Freud and Katherine Margaret McAdam, and great-grandson of Sigmund Freud, was born in London on 7 April 1959 at St Mary's Hospital, Paddington, London, and his family resided at Stafford House, Maida Avenue. Freud has four children.

== Education ==
Paul Freud attended Woolverstone Hall School, an ILEA boarding school in Suffolk (now Ipswich Girls School) from 1970, before leaving to take A levels in Sociology, Psychology and Art elsewhere. He later joined an Art Foundation course at Camberwell College of Arts, followed by a BA (Hons) in Fine Art at Goldsmiths University, London, graduating in 1995.

== Career ==
Paul Freud's work has been described by Dan Crowe, writer at British Vogue as “radically traditional.” April 2006

The artist has travelled extensively and previously resided in New York, Los Angeles, South Africa and Brazil.

A non-extensive list of cultural partners and exhibitors includes:

2006 A series of drawings and paintings of Pope John Paul II at the moment of his demise at Andrew Mummery, Shoreditch, London, UK

2008 - 2014 Solo exhibition at Drawing Museum, Laholm, Sweden

2009 Group show in June 2009 at Trinity Contemporary, London, UK

2010 Solo exhibition of drawings, GGG Gallery, UK

2012 Charcoal on Paper Drawings at Scandinavian Drawing, Scandinavia

2012 A series of Drawings of the Crucification and Other Religious Work at Julian Hartnoll Gallery, London, UK

2013 König Gallery, Berlin, Germany

2014 Galerie König, Hanau, Germany

2017 Belgravia Gallery, UK

2018 Figurative and abstract drawings at Kunsthalle Bremerhaven Gallery, Germany

2019 The Edge of Abstraction, Alinea, The Royal Exchange London

Following are extracts from a speech by Kai Kaehler, Director of Kunsthalle Bremerhaven given at a Private View of Paul Freud's work 24 September 2018:

“In the early 1990s I had the fortune to able to live in London for a while as a student. This was a time when a new generation of artists came to attention, in fact not only they, but British art in general. Brit art was hip. the YBA was, for instance, comparable to the so-called “Young Wilds” of the 1980s in Germany. This was the artistic climate for Paul Freud's training. This was the time of Paul Freud's art studies and under these Goldsmithian influences, he said, according to the preface to one of his exhibitions; “Painting life seemed to me to be the most appropriate and radical thing to do.” I like it. It shows a certain scepticism about the social political potential that art offers as well as about trends. This is a view, which places the driving force, his driving force for his creative work, into a closely positioned, elementary realm, namely himself. But this position is also a very individual one. A position outside the mainstream."

The artist has established a significant presence within the German market, and has been interviewed by public broadcaster ARD television.

On 19 October 2019, Paul Freud's exhibition The Edge of Abstraction opened at The Royal Exchange, London, sponsored by Fortnum and Mason, and featured in Country and Town House Magazine, and The Times Diary.

The Edge of Abstraction is described by Paul Freud as his "most oceanic" body of work, all created during the past 20 years, featuring expressive drawings in black colourfast and lightfast Indian ink, and oil on canvas.

The term the oceanic feeling was first coined by French novelist and playwright Romaine Rolland, in a letter to Sigmund Freud, in reference to a sense of eternity.

Paul Freud's previous work has referred to a latent spirituality and a vivid observational capacity; the series of seven contemporary studies; Reverie, H2O, Cosmic Identification, The Journey, Ocean Feeling, Lignum Vitae and Inner Workings of a Sunshine Mind inspire a peaceful sense of tranquillity.

== See also ==
- Freud family
