= Susie Boyt =

British novelist (born 1969)

- Born: 1969 (age 56–57)
- Occupation: Journalist, novelist

Susie Boyt FRSL (born January 1969) is a British novelist and journalist. She has published seven novels, and a memoir about her obsession with Judy Garland. Boyt was elected a Fellow of the Royal Society of Literature in 2022.

== Life ==
Boyt is the youngest of five daughters of Suzy Boyt and artist Lucian Freud, and great-granddaughter of Sigmund Freud. Boyt was educated at Channing and at Camden School for Girls and read English at St Catherine's College, Oxford, graduating in 1992. As a student her boyfriend died in a climbing accident. She later trained as a bereavement counsellor, and bereavement features as a theme in her novels.

Working variously at a PR agency, and a literary agency, she completed her first novel, The Normal Man, which was published in 1995 by Weidenfeld & Nicolson. She returned to university to do a Masters in Anglo American Literary Relations at University College London, studying the works of Henry James and the poet John Berryman.

As of January 2025, Boyt has published seven novels, the most recent being Loved and Missed (2021). In 2008, she published My Judy Garland Life, a layering of biography, hero-worship and self-help. The book was serialised on Radio 4, shortlisted for the PEN Ackerley prize and adapted as a musical by Amanda Whittington. In 2018, she edited The Turn of the Screw and Other Ghost Stories for Penguin.

Boyt's journalism includes a column in the weekend Life & Arts section of the Financial Times. She is married to Tom Astor, a film producer. They live with their two daughters in London. Boyt is a director at the Hampstead Theatre.

Boyt was elected a Fellow of the Royal Society of Literature in 2022.

== Novels ==
- The Normal Man, 1995
- The Characters of Love, 1996
- The Last Hope of Girls, 2001
- Only Human, 2004
- The Small Hours, 2012
- Love & Fame, 2017
- Loved and Missed, 2021

== Non-fiction ==
- My Judy Garland Life, 2008

== Awards and nominations ==
- The Last Hope of Girls was shortlisted for the John Llewellyn Rhys Prize
- Only Human was shortlisted for the Mind Book of the Year Award
- My Judy Garland Life was shortlisted for the PEN Ackerley Prize

== See also ==
- Freud family
