= Freud Corner (Golders Green Crematorium) =

Crematorium in North London

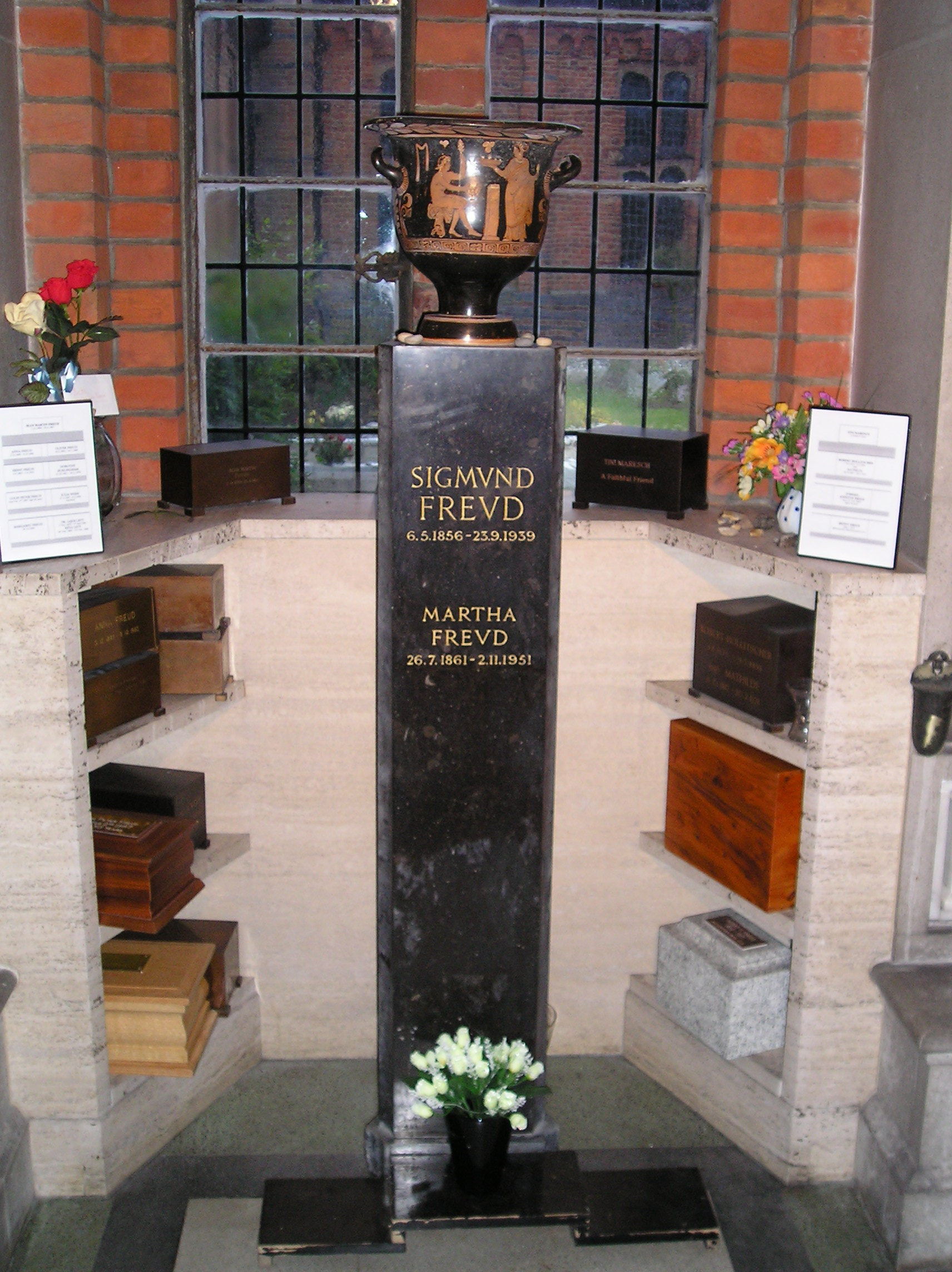
Freud Corner at Golders Green Crematorium, London

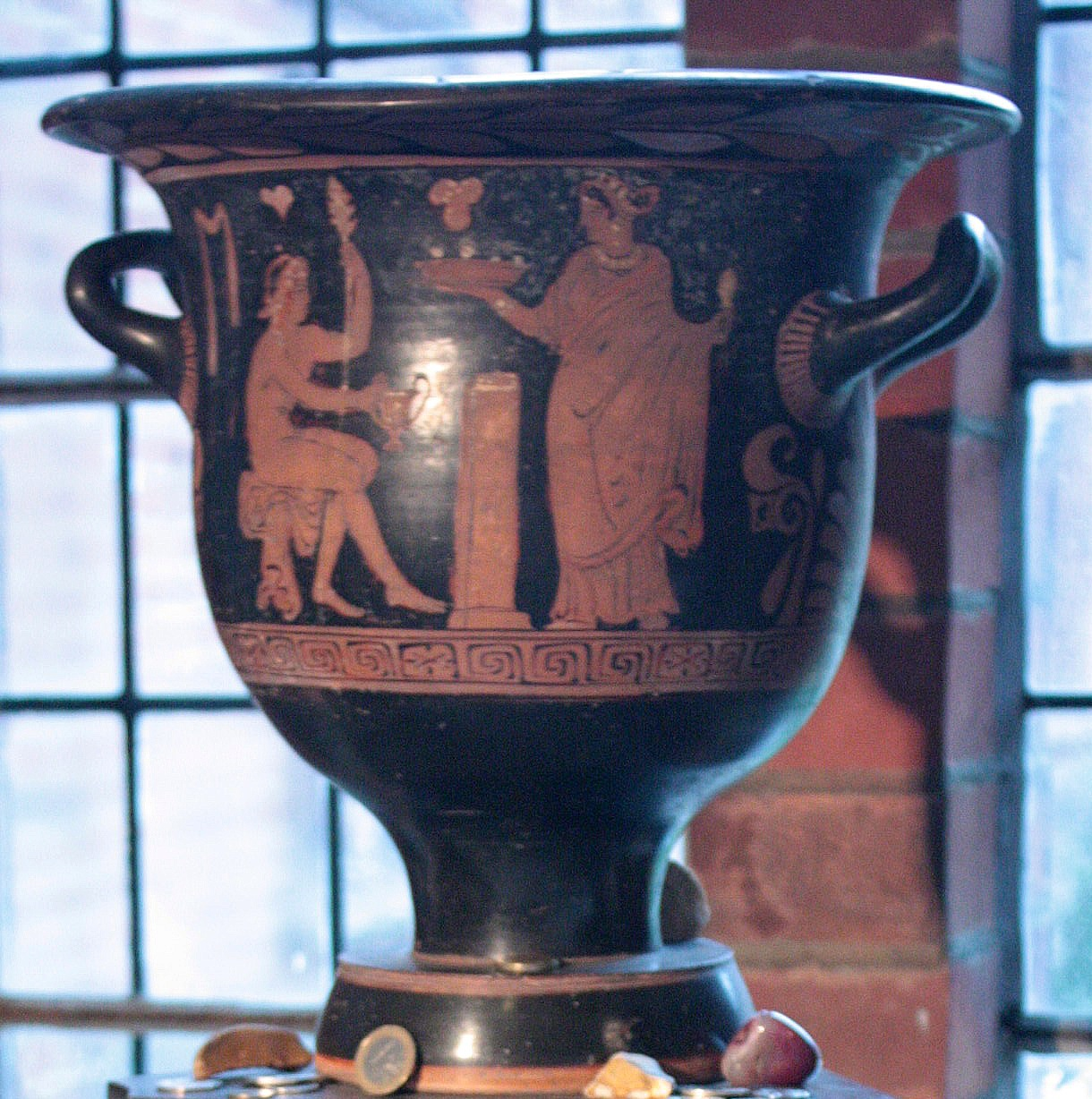
The ancient Greek bell krater with the ashes of Sigmund and Martha Freud

Freud Corner is the name used for the place within Golders Green Crematorium in North London, where the funerary urns of Sigmund Freud and many other members of the Freud family are deposited.

== History ==
When writing his will in 1919, Sigmund Freud stated that he wanted to be cremated as it was a cheaper and easier process than conventional burial. Freud died around 3 A.M on September 23, 1939. Three days later, his body was cremated at Golders Green Crematorium. His son Ernst Freud had organised the funeral arrangements, and Harrods of Knightsbridge acted as funeral directors. After the funeral, Freud's ashes were deposited in an ancient Greek bell krater from the 4th century BC which came from his large collection of over 2000 antiquities (see below). The ancient bell krater, now serving as a funerary urn, was later placed atop a black marble plinth, designed by Ernst Freud and erected in the crematorium's Ernest George Columbarium. This building, built 1922–1928, was designed after Ernest George's death by Alfred Yeates in Romanesque Revival style as a three-sided building, grouped around a central lawn and a lily pond.

After Martha Freud's death in 1951, her ashes were also placed into the ancient bell krater. In the decades that followed, many more members of the Freud family were cremated at Golders Green: Robert Hollitscher (Sigmund Freud's son-in-law), who died in 1959; Jean-Martin Freud (Sigmund Freud's son), who died in 1967; Oliver Freud (Sigmund Freud's son), who died in 1969; Ernst Freud (Sigmund Freud's son), who died in 1970; Henny Freud (née Fuchs, second wife of Oliver Freud), who died in 1971; Mathilde Hollitscher (Sigmund Freud's daughter, widow of Robert Hollitscher), who died in 1978; Anna Freud (Sigmund Freud's daughter), who died in 1982; Colin Peter Freud (Sigmund Freud's great-grandson), who died in 1987; Annette Freud (née Krarup, wife of Anton Walter Freud), who died in 2000; Anton Walter Freud (Jean-Martin Freud's son), who died in 2004; and Margaret Freud (Jean-Martin Freud's partner in England, whom he later adopted). Friends of the Freud family whose ashes rest with them are Lajos Lévy, who died in 1961; his widow Katá, who died in 1969; Dorothy Burlingham, who died in 1979; Jula Weiss, who died in 1994; and Tini Maresch, who died in 1996. The vessels containing their ashes are today kept on three-tiered white stone shelves erected on either side of the plinth with Sigmund and Martha Freud's funerary urn.

On New Year's Day 2014, Golders Green Crematorium staff discovered that burglars had apparently broken into the Ernest George Columbarium overnight and smashed the ancient bell krater containing Sigmund and Martha Freud's ashes in the attempt to steal the vessel. The severely damaged urn was afterwards temporarily moved to a secure location. Today the restored urn is protected by a case of special glass and guarded. Visits to Freud Corner can only be made in the company of a member of Golders Green Crematorium's staff and after reporting to reception.

== Description ==
Freud Corner occupies a window niche, built in red brick, inside the crematorium's Ernest George Columbarium. In the centre of this niche stands a black marble plinth with the funerary urn of Sigmund and Martha Freud on its top. Their names, dates of birth and death are inscribed on the plinth in gold lettering. The vessel containing their ashes is a sealed ancient Greek bell krater, likely made in Apulia, painted with Dionysian scenes. One of these images depicts Dionysus with a maenad. It is not known why, when, and by whom the decision was made to place Freud's ashes in this vessel; there is no mention of such an intention in any of Freud's correspondence, in his last will, or in any subsequent family correspondence. Freud had received this 2,300-year-old item from Princess Marie Bonaparte for his 75th birthday on 6 May 1931. Freud loved the piece, writing to Marie Bonaparte about it: "...it is a pity one cannot take it into one's grave." He used to keep the bell krater on display in his study at Berggasse 19, Vienna, until his forced move to the United Kingdom in June 1938.

The white stone shelf to the left of the black marble plinth with the ancient Greek bell krater holds nine urns, as of 2021. While most of these are brick-sized brownish metal containers inscribed with the name, date of birth and date of death of the deceased, both the ashes of Colin Peter Freud and of Margaret Freud are kept in wooden caskets. The ashes of Dr. Lajos Lévy and his wife Katá are in the same vessel. The cremated remains of the following rest here:

Jean-Martin Freud (1889–1967)
Anna Freud (1895–1982); Ernst Freud (1892–1970)	Oliver Freud (1891–1969); Dorothy Burlingham (1891–1979)
Colin Peter Freud (1956–1987)	Jula Weiss (1905–1994)
Margaret Freud	Dr. Lajos Lévy (1875–1961) and Katá Lévy (1883–1969)

The white stone shelf to the right of the black marble plinth currently holds four urns. The ashes of Tini Maresch are in a brick-sized brownish metal container like those already mentioned. So are those of Mathilde Hollitscher (née Freud) and her husband Robert, which are in the same vessel. The ashes of Anton Walter Freud and his wife Annette share a large wooden casket, while the ashes of Henny Freud are kept in a stone urn made of granite. The cremated remains of the following rest here:

Tini Maresch (1909–1996)
Robert Hollitscher (1875–1959) and Mathilde Hollitscher (née Freud, 1887–1978)

Annette Freud (née Krarup, 1925–2000) and Anton Walter Freud (1921–2004)

Henny Freud (née Fuchs, 1892–1971)
