= Martha Bernays =

Wife of Sigmund Freud

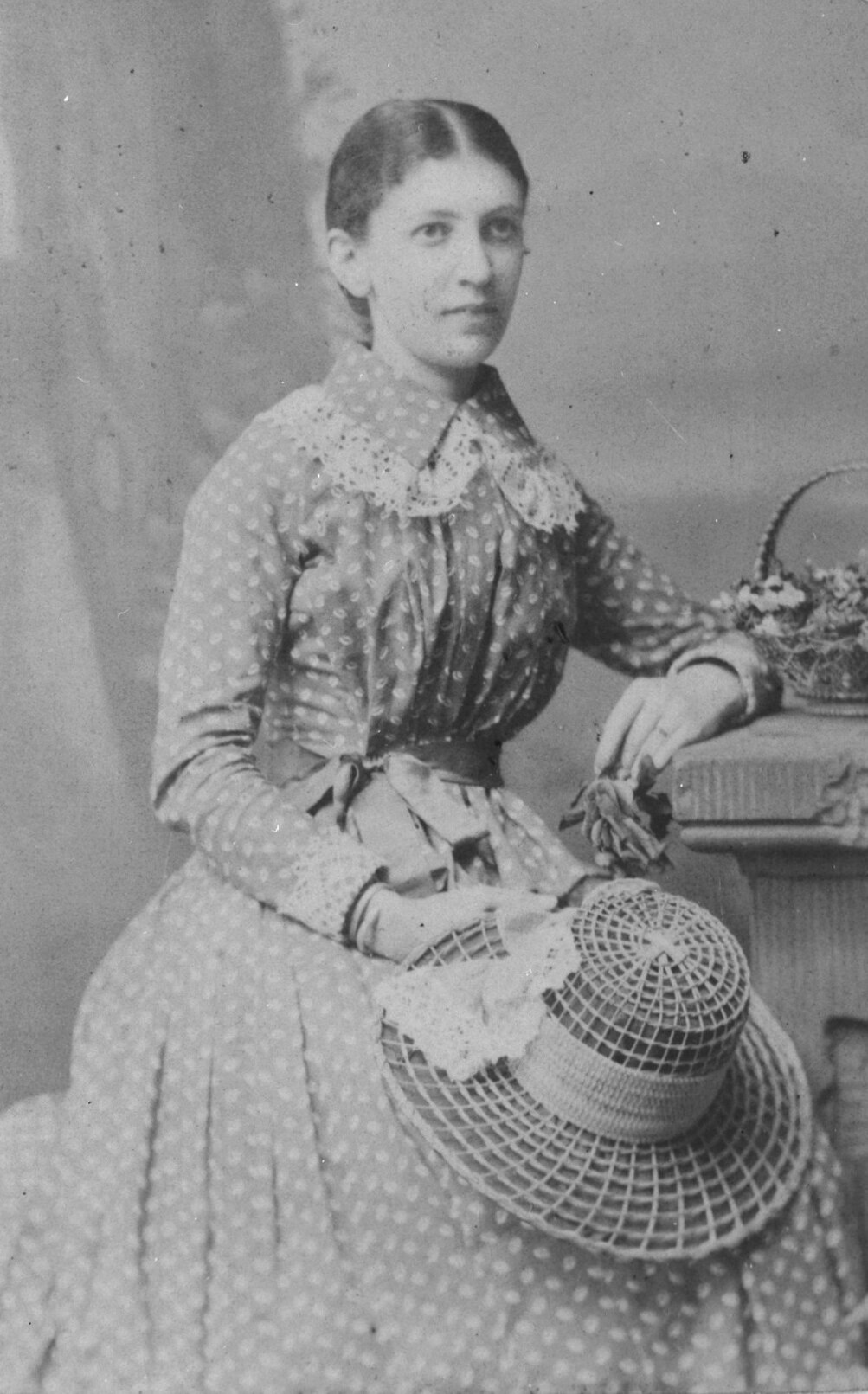
- Bernays, c. 1882
- Born: 26 July 1861; Hamburg, German Confederation
- Died: 2 November 1951 (aged 90); London, England
- Spouse: Sigmund Freud (m. 1886; died 1939)
- Children: 6, including Ernst and Anna
- Relatives: Isaac Bernays (grandfather); Michael Bernays (uncle); Edward Bernays (nephew)

Martha Bernays (/bɜːrˈneɪz/ bur-NAYZ; German: [bɛʁˈnaɪs]; 26 July 1861 – 2 November 1951) was the wife of Austrian psychoanalyst Sigmund Freud.

Bernays was the second daughter of Emmeline and Berman Bernays. Her paternal grandfather Isaac Bernays was a Chief Rabbi of Hamburg.

== Background ==
Martha Bernays was raised in an observant Orthodox Jewish family, the daughter of Berman Bernays (1826–1879) and Emmeline Philipp (1830–1910). Her grandfather, Isaac Bernays, was the chief rabbi of Hamburg and a distant relative of the German Romantic poet Heinrich Heine, who frequently mentioned Isaac in his letters. Isaac's son, Michael Bernays (1834–1897), Martha's uncle, converted to Christianity at an early age and was professor of German at the Ludwig-Maximilians-Universität München. Although the Bernays and Freud families were well-acquainted – her elder brother Eli married Freud's younger sister, for example – the latter were more liberal Jews, and Freud in particular had no time for ritual observances. Martha told a cousin that "not being allowed to light the Sabbath lights on the first Friday night after her marriage was one of the more upsetting experiences of her life". She was also the aunt of Edward Bernays, an Austrian-born American publicist and the "father of public relations". Her maternal cousins were brothers Julius Philipp and Oscar Philipp, founders of Philipp Brothers, which became the largest metal trading company in the world.

== Courtship and marriage ==
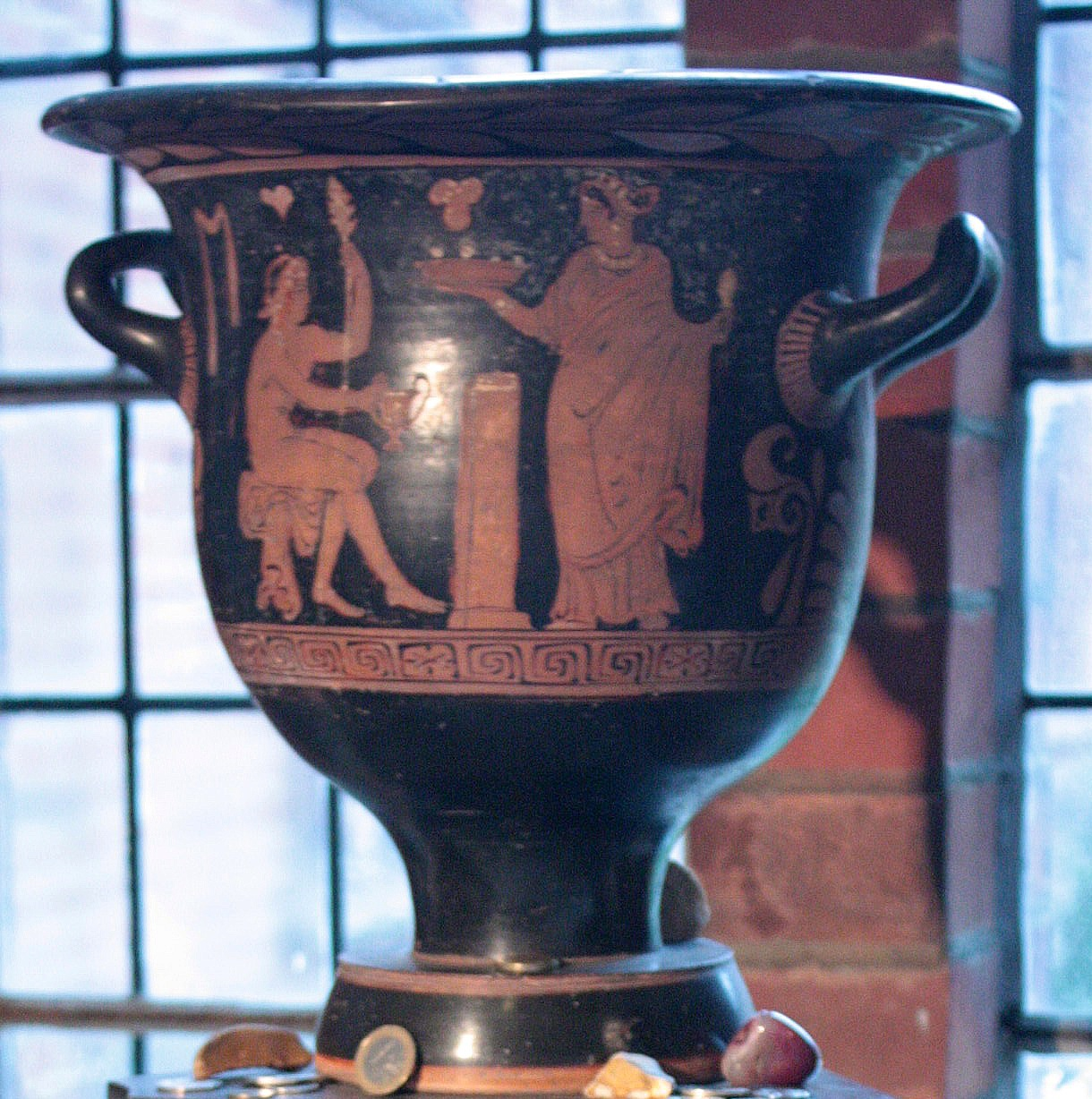
"Freud Corner", Golders Green Crematorium: Ancient Greek bell krater containing the ashes of Sigmund and Martha Freud

Sigmund Freud and Martha met in April 1882 and after a four-year engagement (1882–1886) they were married on 14 September 1886 in Hamburg.

Freud and Bernays's love letters sent during the engagement years, according to Freud's official biographer Ernest Jones, who read all the letters, "would be a not unworthy contribution to the great love literature of the world." Freud sent over 900 (lengthy) letters to his fiancée, which chart the ups and downs of a tempestuous relationship, marred by outbreaks of jealousy on his part as well as affirmations that "I love you with a kind of passionate enchantment".

Their eventual marriage was a much more harmonious affair, with Martha consoling herself after his death with the thought that "in the 53 years of our marriage there was not a single angry word between us". The couple had six children: Mathilde (born 1887), Jean-Martin (born 1889), Oliver (born 1891), Ernst (born 1892), Sophie (born 1893), and Anna (born 1895).

Martha Freud died in 1951. She was cremated at Golders Green Crematorium and her ashes placed in the Freud Corner, into the same ancient Greek funeral urn that holds her husband's ashes.

== Character ==
The young Martha Bernays was intelligent, well-educated and fond of reading (as she remained throughout her life). As a married woman, she ran her household efficiently, and was indeed almost obsessive about punctuality and dirt. Firm but loving with her children, she spread an atmosphere of peaceful joie de vivre through the household (at least according to the French analyst René Laforgue). However, Martha was not able to establish a strong connection with her youngest daughter, Anna.

== Relationship with her sister ==
Bernays's younger sister, Minna Bernays, was very close to the young couple, and moved in with them in the 1890s to set up what has (jokingly) been called a ménage à trois. Sigmund and Minna would sometimes holiday together, and the suggestion has periodically been made that she in fact became Freud's mistress. Jung for example reported (late in life) that from Minna he "learned that Freud was in love with her and that their relationship was indeed very intimate". Freud historian Peter Swales "became notorious when, in 1981, he maintained that Freud had had a secret affair with his wife Martha’s younger sister Minna Bernays ... and had arranged for her to have an abortion after she became pregnant."

This claim was (and is) controversial. The publication of a hotel log from 1898 registering the pair as "Dr Sigm Freud u frau" in a double room prompted some Freud scholars, including his defender Peter Gay, to regard the conjecture of Freud and Minna having an affair as possibly accurate. Other proponents of the affair, however — relying on their analysis of Freud's own autobiographical writings — believe that it was consummated only in 1900.

Opponents point to the unlikelihood of such a betrayal taking place between sisters as close as Minna and Martha, especially given the mores of the time, and to the less sensational possibility of the hotel simply being full at the time. Pending publication of the Freud/Minna correspondence for the period 1893–1910, the truth behind such speculations may not be known for sure.

What does seem certain is that Martha herself in no way knew of, or colluded in, any such affair. Freud described her as thoroughly good, where he and Minna were more self-willed and wild, and for better or worse her commitment to conventional morality, domestic duty and family values is clear. (Her husband too had shocked André Breton by his lack of any Bohemianism, and considered a sexually promiscuous woman as "simply a Haderlump [a ragamuffin]".) Martha's attitude to infidelity is perhaps best illustrated by her reaction to their friend Stefan Zweig's leaving his wife Friderike for a younger woman. Six years after Zweig's death in 1942, Martha wrote to his widow that she still resented "our friend's infidelity to you!"

== See also ==
- Family nexus
- Freud family
- Love triangle
