= Golders Green Crematorium =

Crematorium in London, England

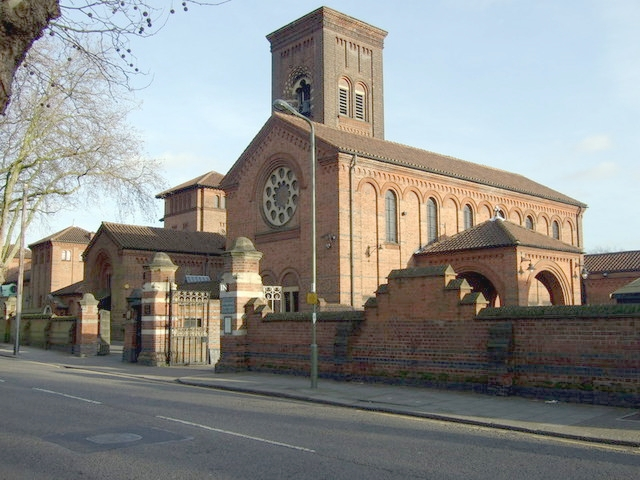
- The Bedford Chapel at Golders Green Crematorium
- Interactive map of Golders Green Crematorium

Details
- Established: 1902
- Location: 62 Hoop Lane, London, NW11 7NL
- Country: England
- Coordinates: 51°34′38″N 000°11′37″W
- Type: Public
- Owned by: London Cremation Company
- Size: 12 acres (4.9 ha)
- Website: London Cremation Company website

Golders Green Crematorium and Mausoleum was the first crematorium to be opened in London, and is one of the oldest crematoria in Britain. The land for the crematorium was purchased in 1900, costing £6,000 (equivalent to £637,620 in 2025) and the crematorium was opened in 1902 by Sir Henry Thompson, founder of the Cremation Society.

Golders Green Crematorium, as it is usually called, is in Hoop Lane, off Finchley Road, Golders Green, in northwest London, near Golders Green Underground station. It is directly opposite the Golders Green Jewish Cemetery. The crematorium is secular and accepts all faiths and non-believers. The crematorium gardens are listed at Grade I in the National Register of Historic Parks and Gardens.

== History ==
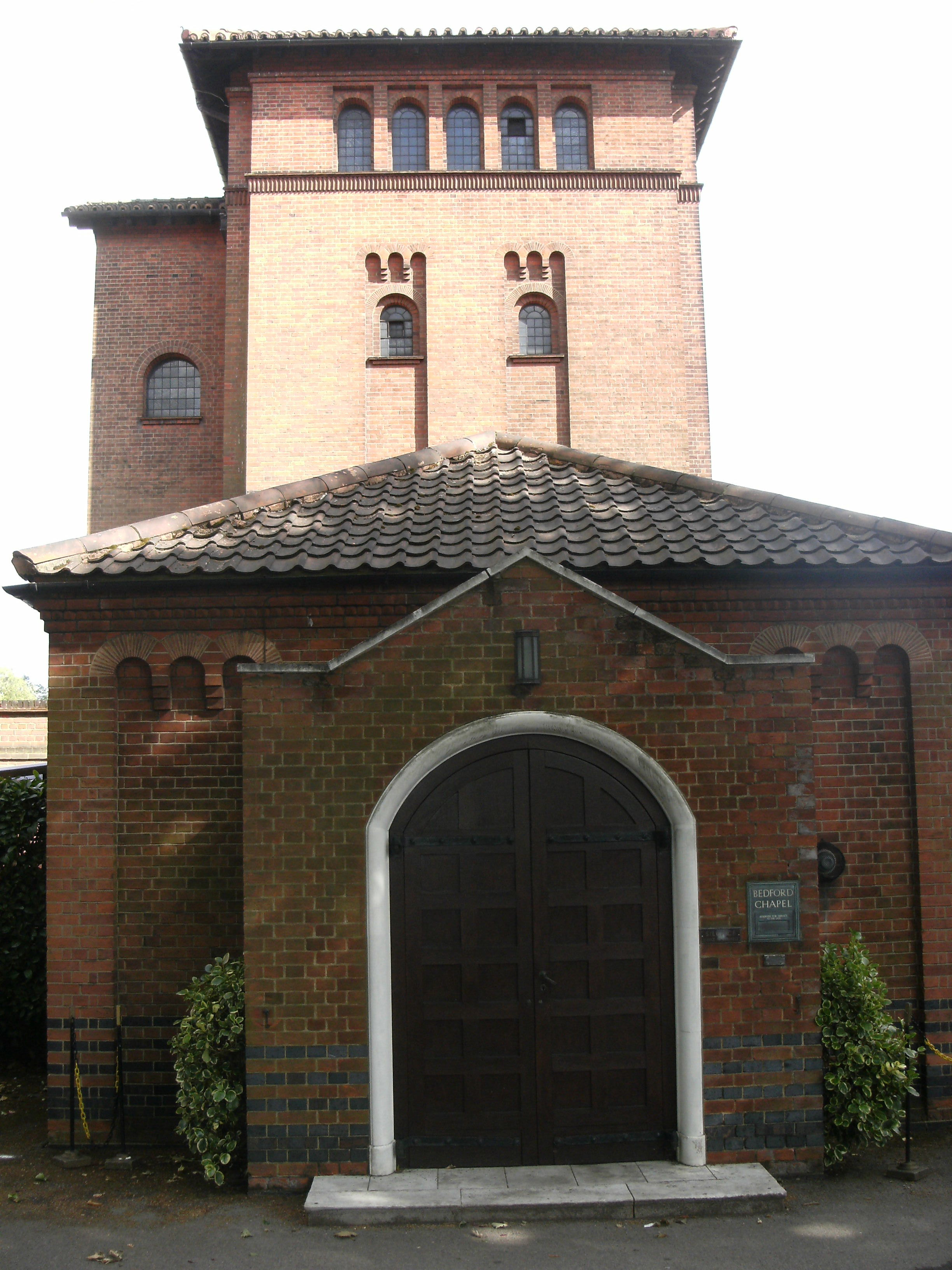
The Bedford Chapel at Golders Green Crematorium

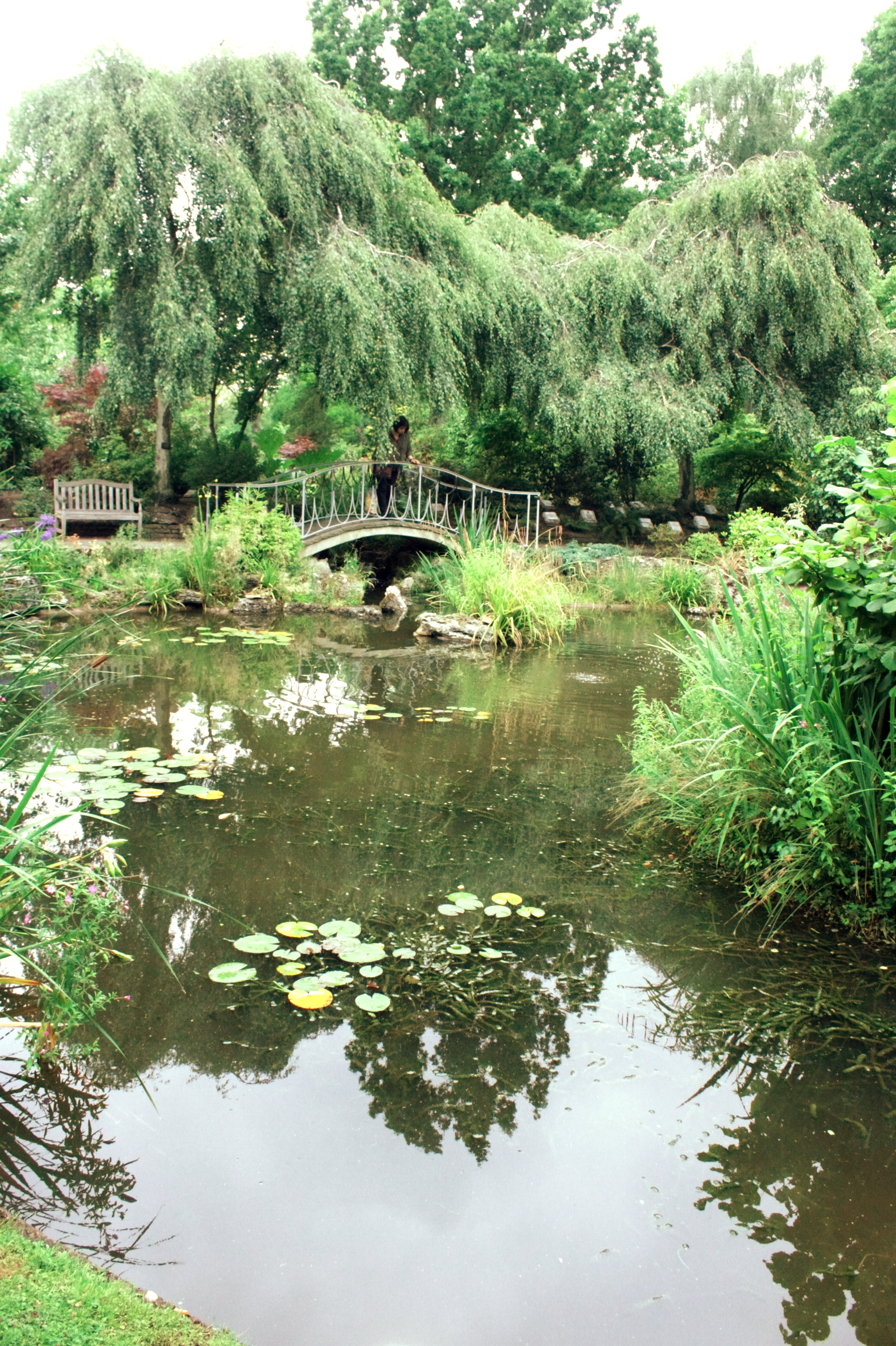
Horder Japanese Garden Pond

The lawfulness of cremation in Great Britain was not established until 1885. The Woking Crematorium had already been built in Woking and proved successful. At that time, cremation was championed by the Cremation Society of England. This society was governed by a council, at that time led by Sir Henry Thompson (president and founding member). There is a bust to his memory in the West Chapel of Golders Green Crematorium. Out of this Society was formed the London Cremation Company (which has its offices on the premises), who desired to build a crematorium within easy reach of London.

The crematorium in Golders Green was designed by the architect Sir Ernest George and his partner Alfred Yeates. The gardens were laid out by William Robinson. The crematorium is a red brick building in Lombardic style and was built in stages, as money became available. The crematorium opened in 1902 and was built in four phases (1901–1910, 1910–1911, 1912–1916, 1926–1928). By 1939, the site was largely completed, although since then some buildings have been added. Since November 1902 more than 323,500 cremations have taken place at Golders Green Crematorium, far more than any other British crematorium. It is estimated that the crematorium now averages around 2,000 cremations a year. The funerals of many prominent people have taken place there over the last century.

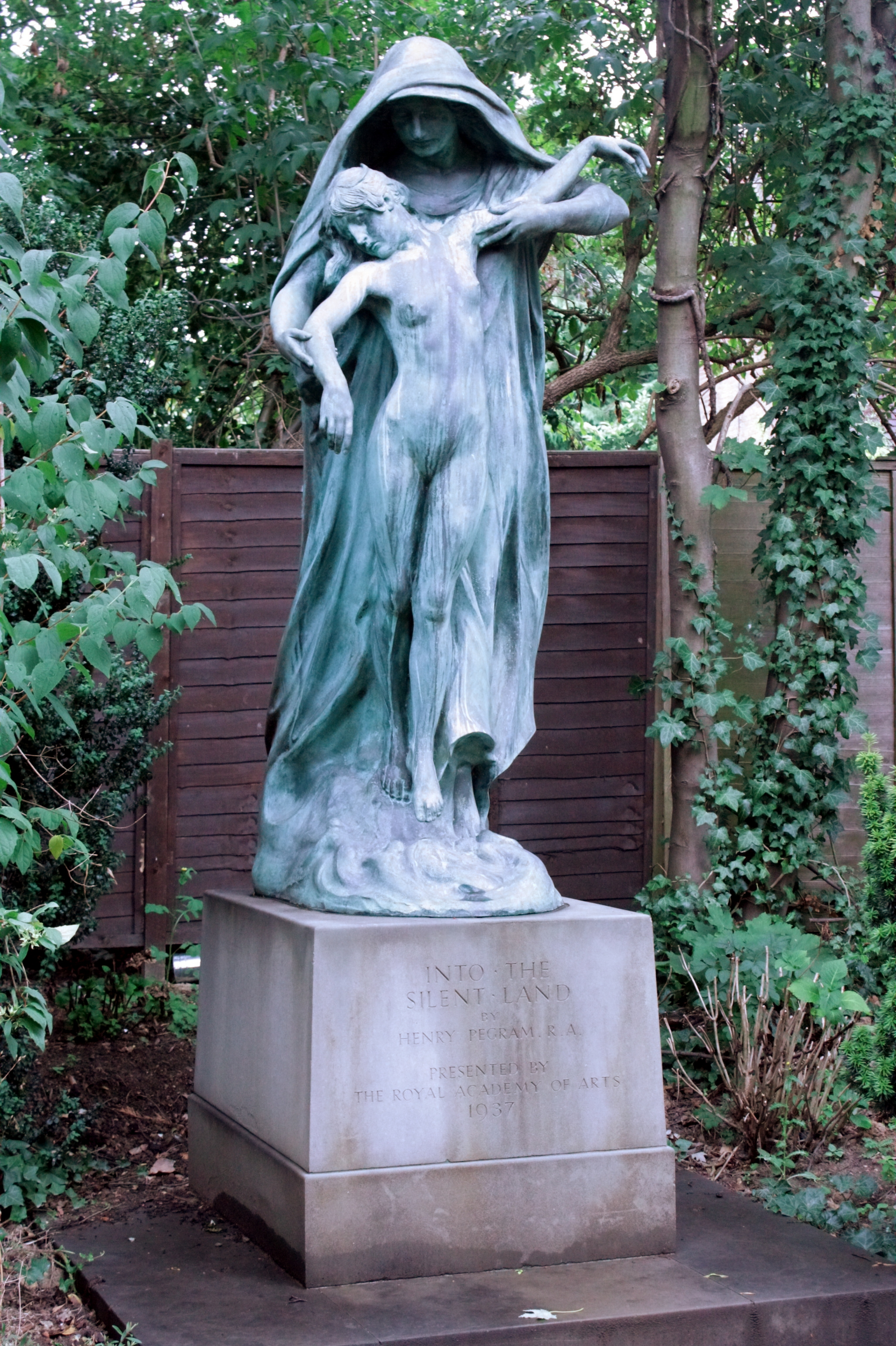
Into the Silent Land by Henry Alfred Pegram

The chimney of the crematorium is located within the tower and the building is in an Italianate style. The 12 acres (4.9 ha) of gardens are extensively planted, and produce a beautiful and tranquil environment for visitors. There are several large tombs, two ponds and bridge, and a large crocus lawn. Another notable feature is a special children's section, which includes a swinging bench. There is also a 'communist corner' with memorials to notable members of the Communist Party of Great Britain. There are two cremation chapels and a Chapel of Memory. There are also three columbaria containing the ashes of thousands of Londoners and residents of neighbouring counties.

Fourteen holders of the Victoria Cross have been cremated here, and there are locations and memorials for many other military personnel of all ranks, and from many countries. Largest among them is the Commonwealth War Graves Commission memorial, commemorating 497 British and Commonwealth military casualties of both World Wars who were cremated here. Designed by Sir Edward Maufe, it was unveiled in 1952. Built in Portland stone with names listed on three bronze panels, it stands at head of an ornamental pond at the western end of the memorial cloister.

At Christmas, a Christmas tree is erected in the field in front of the main buildings. Although the crematorium is secular, a nativity scene is also placed near the Chapel of Memory.

== Monuments ==
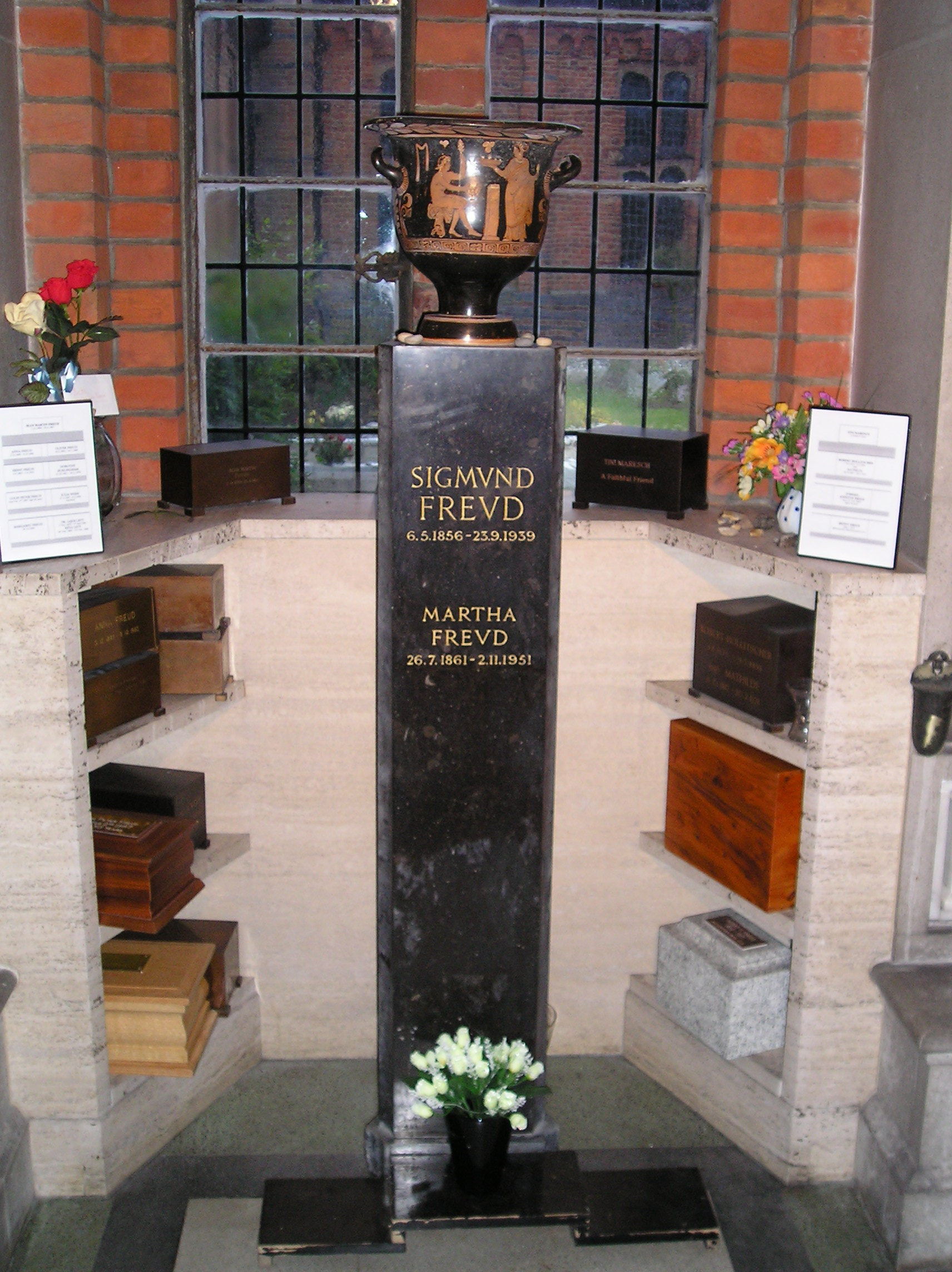
The Freud Corner at Golders Green Crematorium

The crematorium gardens are listed at Grade I in the National Register of Historic Parks and Gardens. The Philipson Family mausoleum, designed by Edwin Lutyens, is a Grade II* listed building on the National Heritage List for England and the crematorium building, the wall, along with memorials and gates, the Martin Smith Mausoleum and Into The Silent Land, a sculpture by Henry Alfred Pegram are all Grade II listed buildings. The largest sculpture portraying someone cremated here is the statue of Indian industrialist and friend of Gandhi, Ghanshyam Das Birla.

== Visiting ==
A map of the Garden of Rest and some information on persons cremated here is available from the office. Staff are available to help in finding a specific location.

== Notable cremations ==
=== Ashes at Golders Green Crematorium ===
Among those whose ashes are retained or were scattered here, are:

- Richard Addinsell, English composer (ashes scattered in communal section of crocus lawn)
- Larry Adler, American harmonica player
- Kingsley Amis, British writer, one of the Angry young men
- Boris Anrep, Russian artist
- Pegaret Anthony, British artist
- Sir Fenton Aylmer, 13th Baronet, British soldier, VC recipient
- Sir Edward Battersby Bailey, geologist
- Lionel Bart, composer of Oliver! and many other shows and songs
- Ronnie Biggs, criminal and participant of The Great Train Robbery of 1963
- Eric Blom, British musicologist
- Simon Blumenfeld, writer and columnist
- Enid Blyton, children's author (Famous Five, Noddy)
- Marc Bolan, musician, poet and writer (founder of T. Rex)
- Bernard Bresslaw, Carry On film series actor
- Arthur Brough, actor
- George Brown, Baron George-Brown, Labour party politician, ultimately Foreign Secretary.
- Jack Bruce, Scottish composer, musician and member of Cream
- Mrs Victor Bruce, racing motorist, speedboat racer and aviator
- Bella Burge, music hall performer and boxing promoter
- Sir Neville Cardus, notable cricket writer, also distinguished music critic
- George Clarke, 1st Baron Sydenham of Combe, English colonial administrator and writer
- Eric Coates, English composer of light music
- Leslie Compton, English footballer and cricketer
- Steve Conway, singer
- Cicely Courtneidge, actress and comedian
- Walter Crane, English artist and book illustrator
- Tony Crombie, English jazz musician
- Victor Dandré, Russian impresario and husband of Anna Pavlova
- Ed Devereaux, Australian actor
- James Dewar, British chemist and physicist (inventor of the Dewar flask or vacuum flask)
- Edith Durham, writer, traveller and anthropologist
- Ray Ellington, English musician
- Havelock Ellis, intellectual
- Dame Millicent Fawcett, leader of the suffragist movement
- Kathleen Ferrier, British singer (there is a rosebed in her memory)
- Molly Fink, Australian socialite and wife of Marthanda Bhairava Tondaiman of Pudukkottai.
- Bud Flanagan, singer and Crazy Gang star
- George Frampton, British sculptor
- Lynne Frederick, actress
- Anna Freud, daughter of Sigmund Freud, also a psychoanalyst, especially of children
- Sigmund and Martha Freud, father of modern psychoanalysis and his wife
- Ernest George, English architect (and who designed this crematorium with Alfred Yeates)
- Simon Gipps-Kent, English actor, Crocus Lawn, Section 3H
- Elinor Glyn, English romantic novelist and scriptwriter.
- Ernő Goldfinger, Hungarian born architect and designer of furniture
- Charles Gray, English actor
- Hughie Green, Canadian born quiz show host
- Arthur Greenwood, English Labour politician (ashes and memorial, Bay 17 of the East Boundary Wall)
- Joyce Grenfell, actress and comedian
- John Gross, writer
- Irene Handl, actress and comedian
- Tommy Handley, British comedian
- Robert Harbin, South African born magician and writer
- Cedric Hardwicke, English actor
- Jack Hawkins, actor
- Tubby Hayes, English jazz musician
- Ian Hendry, actor
- Patrick Hennessy, Irish Realist Artist
- Dezo Hoffmann, Slovak photographer of actors and rock stars including the Beatles
- Henry Holland, 1st Viscount Knutsford, British Conservative politician
- Lady Margaret Huggins and her husband Sir William Huggins, astronomers
- Ralph Ince, American film actor, director and screenwriter
- Gordon Jackson, actor
- Alex James, footballer
- Sid James, South African-born actor, Bless This House and Carry On film series star
- Sir Geoffrey Alan Jellicoe, architect
- Jimmy Jewel, comedian
- Yootha Joyce, actress
- Geoffrey Keen, actor
- Barbara Keogh, actress
- Albert William Ketèlbey, English composer, conductor and pianist
- Johnny Kidd, singer
- David Kossoff, actor, writer, and campaigner
- Paul Kossoff, musician (guitarist with Free, among others)
- Alfred Lawrence, 1st Baron Trevethin, former Lord Chief Justice of England, drowned in fishing accident.
- Doris Lessing, writer, 2007 Nobel Prize in Literature laureate
- Percy Wyndham Lewis, artist and writer
- William Howard Livens, military engineer and inventor
- Wolf Mankowitz, British playwright and screenwriter
- Karl Mannheim, Hungarian-born British sociologist, founder of the sociology of knowledge
- Moore Marriott, British comic actor
- Mary Millar, British actress and singer
- Marthanda Bhairava Tondaiman, Raja of Pudukkottai 1886–1928
- Keith Moon, musician (drummer for The Who)
- Janet Munro, actress, wife of actor Ian Hendry (above)
- Alexander Murray, 8th Earl of Dunmore, British soldier, politician and VC winner
- Ivor Novello, actor, writer and lyricist
- Seán O'Casey, Irish playwright
- Joe Orton, playwright
- Betty Papworth, communist and anti-war activist
- Val Parnell, impresario
- Anna Pavlova, Russian ballerina
- Harry Pollitt, General Secretary of the Communist Party of Great Britain
- Baron Albert Profumo, Barrister
- Marie Rambert, ballerina and founder of Rambert Dance Company
- Edith Rosenbaum, First Class survivor of the sinking of RMS Titanic
- William Rust, Communist activist, editor of The Daily Worker
- Ronnie Scott, British jazz musician
- Phil Seamen, British jazz musician
- Peter Sellers, actor and comedian
- Geoffrey Shaw, composer
- Ella Shields, Music Hall artiste and male impersonator
- Kathleen Simon, Viscountess Simon, abolitionist
- Bernard Spilsbury, pathologist
- Bram Stoker, Irish writer (Dracula)
- John Stride, actor
- Mollie Sugden, actress, best known for Are You Being Served?
- A. J. P. Taylor, historian
- Sir Mowbray Thomson, K.C.S.I, British East India Company general and author
- Sir Henry Thompson, 1st Baronet, surgeon and founder of the Cremation Society of England
- Karl Tunberg, American screenwriter, author and film producer; past-president WGA, West (US)
- Tommy Vance, British broadcaster
- Conrad Veidt, German actor, following cremation in the US
- Vesta Victoria, music hall performer
- Dame Barbara Windsor, Carry On film series, EastEnders actress
- Bernie Winters, comedian
- Victoria Wood, British comedian
- Maurice Woodruff, English clairvoyant, following cremation in Singapore
- Peter Wyngarde, actor

=== Ashes taken elsewhere ===
Among those cremated here, but whose ashes are elsewhere, are:

- Dame Peggy Ashcroft, actress, ashes scattered in the Great Garden at New Place, Stratford-upon-Avon, Warwickshire
- Arnold Bennett, novelist, ashes buried at Burslem Cemetery, Staffordshire
- Ernest Bevin, British Labour politician, ashes removed to Westminster Abbey
- Sir Alfred Billson (1839–1907), Liberal MP, ashes buried at Kensal Green Cemetery.
- Hypatia Bradlaugh Bonner, daughter of Charles Bradlaugh, atheist and freethinking author and peace campaigner, ashes buried in Brookwood Cemetery.
- Horatio Bottomley, British Liberal, later Independent, M.P., journalist, swindler, ashes scattered on Sussex Downs
- Brendan Bracken, 1st Viscount Bracken, Irish born British Conservative politician ashes scattered on Romney Marshes.
- James Bryce, 1st Viscount Bryce, British jurist and Liberal politician, ashes buried at Grange Cemetery, Edinburgh.
- Neville Chamberlain, British Conservative politician and Prime Minister, ashes removed to Westminster Abbey
- Alan J. Charig, British Palaeontologist, ashes scattered with his wife’s at Woldingham Viewpoint near Oxted, Surrey.
- Peter Cook, British actor and comedian, ashes buried in an unmarked plot behind St. John's Church in Hampstead.
- Bebe Daniels, American actress, singer and writer, with her husband, Ben Lyon, at the Hollywood Forever Cemetery, Hollywood
- Sir Charles Dilke, Radical Liberal MP, his ashes were buried at Kensal Green Cemetery.
- Ian Dury, English singer-lyricist, best known for No. 1 hit "Hit Me with Your Rhythm Stick", his ashes have reputedly been scattered in the Thames, there is a memorial bench in Richmond Park
- T. S. Eliot, Anglo-American poet, playwright, and literary critic, ashes in St Michael's Church in East Coker, Somerset
- Lily Elsie, actress (location of ashes unknown)
- Barry Evans, English actor (location of ashes unknown)
- John Fisher, 1st Baron Fisher, Admiral of the Fleet, ashes buried at Kilverstone, Norfolk.
- John French, 1st Earl of Ypres, Field Marshal, ashes buried at Ripple, Kent.
- Sir Edward German, composer, ashes buried at Whitchurch, Shropshire.
- David Gest, Music producer, Comedian and Television personality. Funeral service held at Golders Green Crematorium on 29 April 2016, His ashes were scattered in York.
- W. S. Gilbert, dramatist and author, who with Arthur Sullivan wrote the Savoy operas, ashes buried at the Church of St. John the Evangelist, Stanmore.
- Sir Charles Henry, expatriate Australian businessman and Liberal Member of Parliament (MP) in the British Parliament, ashes buried Willesden Jewish Cemetery.
- Richard Hillary, Anglo-Australian RAF fighter ace, ashes scattered over English Channel. He is listed on Commonwealth War Graves Commission cremation memorial.
- Reginald Hine, British historian, ashes scattered at Minsden Chapel
- Eric Hobsbawm, British historian, ashes interred at Highgate Cemetery
- Professor Louis Hoffmann (Angelo John Lewis), author of "Modern Magic" (1876) and other books on magic, games, amusements and puzzles. Funeral service and cremation took place at Golders Green on 29 December 1919, location of ashes unknown.
- Gary Holton, actor best known as the star of Auf Wiedersehen, Pet, his ashes rest in Maesgwastad Cemetery, Welshpool, Montgomeryshire
- Kenneth Horne, comedian and businessman, star of Much-Binding-in-the-Marsh, Beyond Our Ken and Round the Horne, ashes buried at Stoke Poges Memorial Gardens, Buckinghamshire.
- A.E. Housman, classical scholar and poet, author of A Shropshire Lad, ashes interred outside St Laurence's Church, Ludlow, Shropshire, England
- John Inman, actor, star of Are You Being Served?, location of ashes unknown
- Henry Irving, stage actor in the Victorian era, ashes removed to Westminster Abbey
- Rufus Isaacs, 1st Marquess of Reading, Liberal politician and lawyer, ashes buried at the nearby Jewish cemetery
- Henry James, American-born British novelist, ashes buried at Cambridge, Massachusetts, U.S.A.
- Jerome K. Jerome, writer, ashes buried at St Mary's Churchyard, Ewelme, Oxfordshire
- Kenrick Hymans ("Snakehips") Johnson, Guyanese-born British jazz band leader, cremated here, ashes removed to chapel of Sir William Borlase's Grammar School, Marlow, Buckinghamshire
- Adrian Jones, sculptor of various war and other military memorials, ashes interred outside St Laurence's Church, Ludlow.
- Ernest Jones, psychoanalyst, ashes were buried in the grave of the oldest of his four children in the churchyard of St Cadoc's Church, Cheriton on the Gower Peninsula
- Hetty King, Music Hall artiste and male impersonator.
- Rudyard Kipling, British author and poet, ashes removed to Poet's Corner, Westminster Abbey
- Sir Alexander Korda, Hungarian-born film producer, ashes buried at Stoke Poges Memorial Gardens, Buckinghamshire.
- Leonid Krasin, Russian and Soviet Bolshevik politician and diplomat, ashes buried in the Kremlin Wall Necropolis
- Kit Lambert, manager and record producer for The Who, ashes buried at Brompton Cemetery
- Verity Lambert, television producer.
- Vivien Leigh, English actress, ashes were scattered on the lake at Tickerage Mill, near Blackboys, Sussex
- Alice Liddell, ashes removed to Lyndhurst, Hampshire (see Alice's Adventures in Wonderland).
- Lieutenant General Samuel Lomax, died of wounds World War I, ashes buried at Aldershot Military Cemetery
- Princess Louise, Duchess of Argyll, ashes buried at the Royal Burial Ground at Frogmore
- Princess Louise Margaret, Duchess of Connaught and Strathearn, the first member of the British royal family to be cremated, ashes buried at the Royal Burial Ground at Frogmore
- Charles Rennie Mackintosh, Scottish architect, ashes scattered at sea at Port Vendres, France.
- James Leslie Mitchell, Scottish author, who also wrote as Lewis Grassic Gibbon, ashes interred in the cemetery at Arbuthnott in Kincardineshire.
- Matt Monro, singer, ashes removed by the family
- George Moore (1852-1933), Irish novelist, ashes buried in an urn on Castle Island in Lough Carra, County Mayo, in sight of the ruins of his ancestral family home at Moore Hall.
- John Morley, 1st Viscount Morley of Blackburn, Liberal politician, ashes buried at Putney Vale Cemetery.
- Peter O'Toole, actor and author, cremated on 21 December 2013 in a wicker coffin, ashes scattered in Connemara, Ireland.
- Marian Cripps, Baroness Parmoor, anti-war activist, ashes taken to Frieth
- H. G. Pelissier, actor, composer and satirist, ashes rest in Marylebone Cemetery
- Admiral of the Fleet Sir Dudley Pound, ashes, with those of his wife, scattered at sea; commemorated on the Commonwealth War Graves Commission cremation memorial here.
- King Prajadhipok of Thailand, ashes removed to Chakri Throne Hall in the Grand Palace, Bangkok.
- Wendy Richard, English actress, ashes interred at East Finchley Cemetery
- Arnold Ridley, author and actor, ashes rest in Bath Abbey Cemetery
- Herbrand Russell, 11th Duke of Bedford, politician and hereditary peer, President of the Cremation Society. Ashes buried at St Michael's Church, Chenies, Buckinghamshire.
- Ernest Rutherford, 1st Baron Rutherford of Nelson, physicist, ashes removed to Westminster Abbey.
- Shapurji Saklatvala, Indian-born Labour and Communist Member of the British Parliament. Cremated here, ashes buried at the Parsi burial ground in Brookwood Cemetery.
- Dorothy L. Sayers, novelist, playwright, translator and critic. Her ashes are buried at the base of the tower of St Anne's Church, Soho.
- Richard Bowdler Sharpe, zoologist, founder of the British Ornithologists' Club and Assistant Keeper of the British Museum
- Sophia Duleep Singh (1876–1948) Indian princess and suffragette, daughter of the last Maharaja of the Punjab. Cremated here, ashes scattered in the Punjab.
- F. E. Smith, 1st Earl of Birkenhead, lawyer-statesman, ashes buried at Charlton, Northamptonshire.
- Sir Charles Villiers Stanford, composer, ashes buried in Westminster Abbey.
- Vivian Stanshall, founding member of the Bonzo Dog Doo-Dah Band, artist, poet and broadcaster. His ashes are in the possession of his wife and daughter. A memorial plaque is in the crematorium's Poets' Corner, unveiled on 13 December 2015.
- Air Vice Marshal Sir Frederick Sykes, early Royal Air Force commander and Conservative politician, cremated here, ashes scattered on Salisbury Plain.
- Ellen Terry, actress, ashes kept at St Paul's, Covent Garden, London
- D.A. Thomas, Viscount Rhondda (1855-1918), Liberal cabinet minister and coal owner, ashes buried at St Mary's Church, Llanwern, Monmouthshire
- James Henry Thomas (1874–1949), Labour cabinet minister and railwaymen's trade union leader, ashes buried at Swindon, Wiltshire.
- H. G. Wells, English author, ashes scattered at sea
- Ralph Vaughan Williams, composer, ashes buried in North Aisle, Westminster Abbey
- Amy Winehouse, singer-songwriter, ashes buried at Edgwarebury Cemetery, alongside her grandmother.
- Szmul Zygielbojm, Polish-Jewish political activist who committed suicide in London, in 1943, as a protest against international indifference towards the Holocaust. His ashes were transferred to New York in 1961 by fellow members of the Bund Jewish Organization.

== Gallery ==
Scenes around Golders Green Crematorium
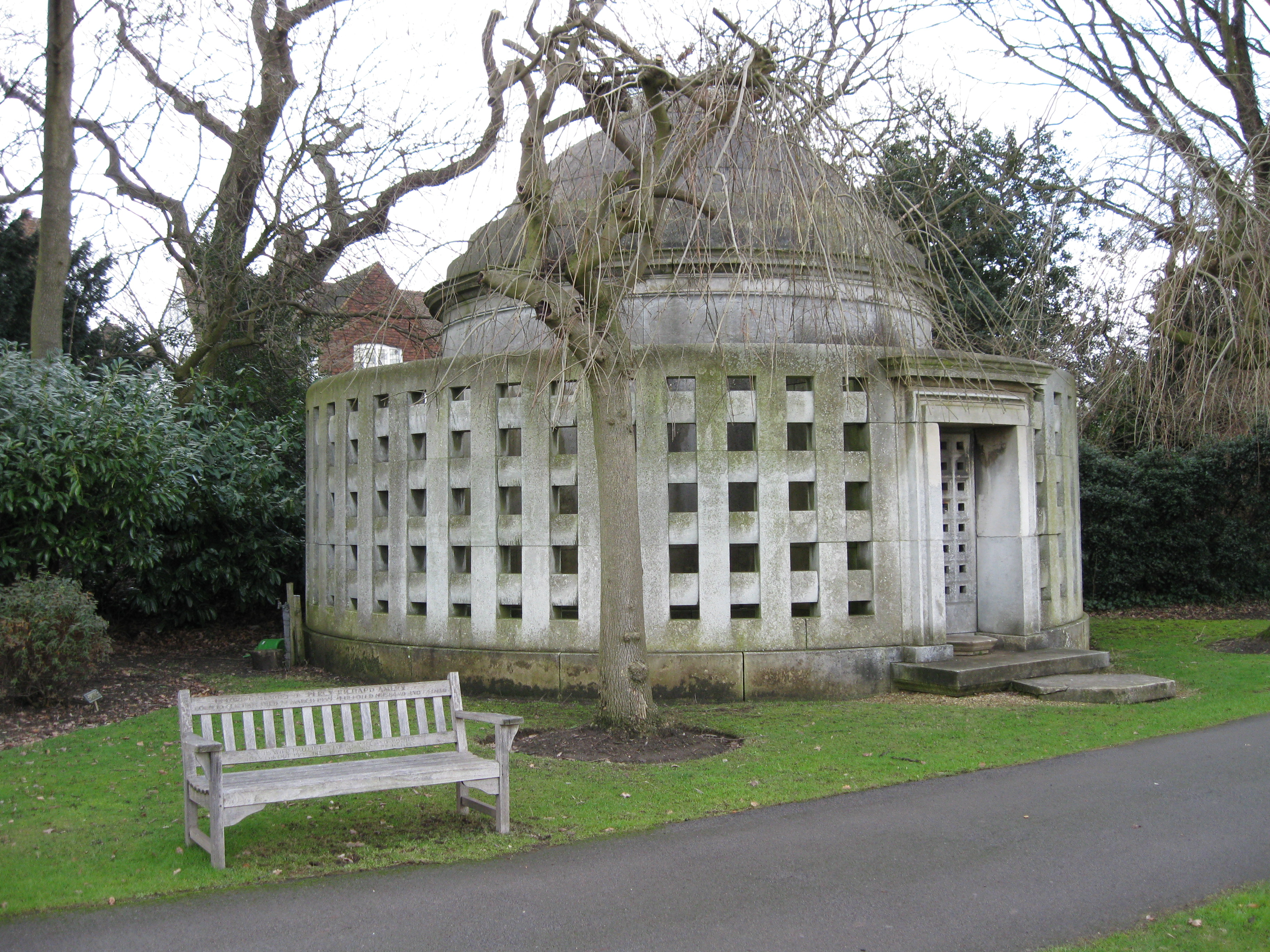
The Philipson Mausoleum by Edwin Lutyens

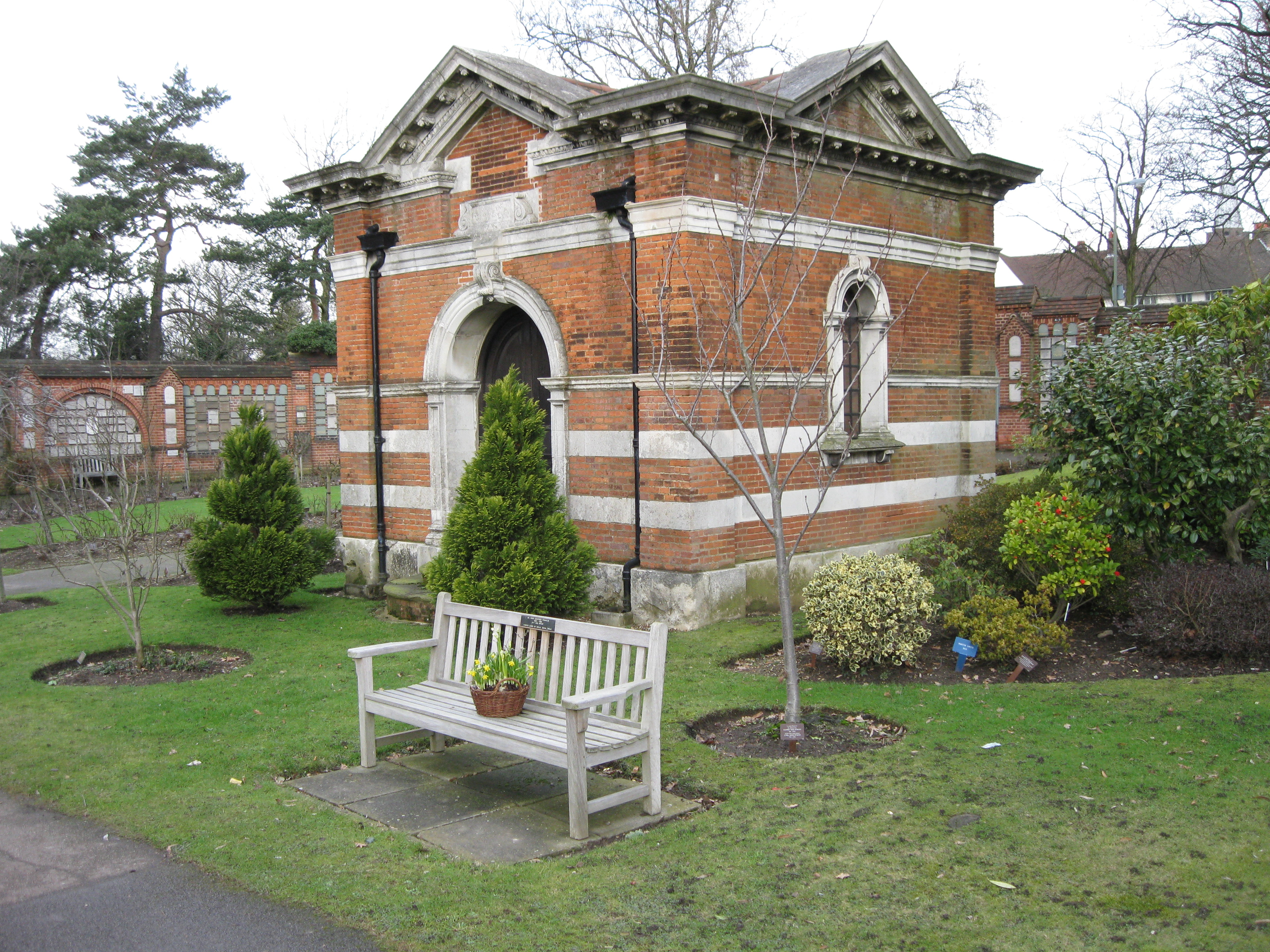
The Smith Mausoleum by Paul Phipps

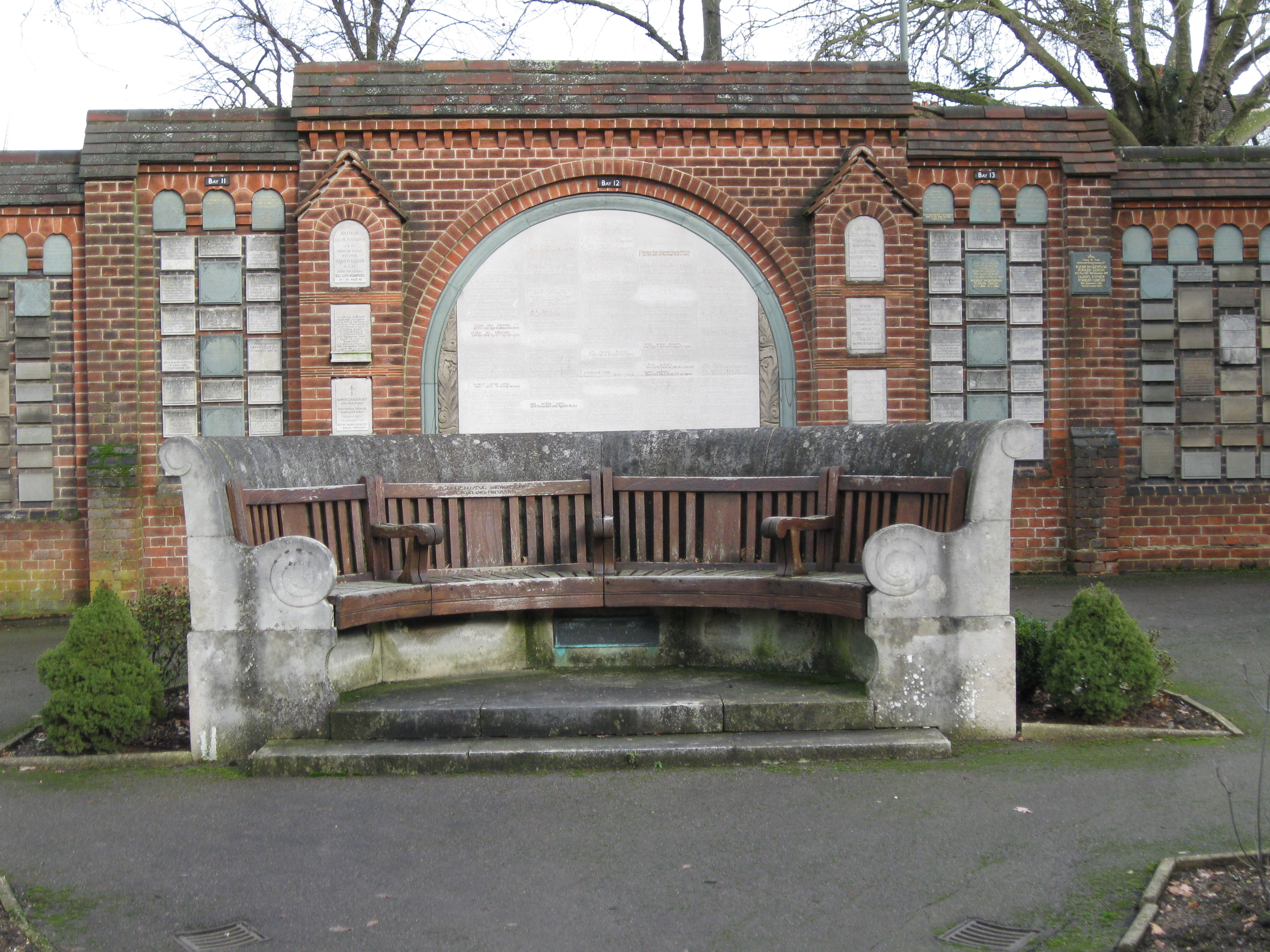
Bench in the Garden of Rest

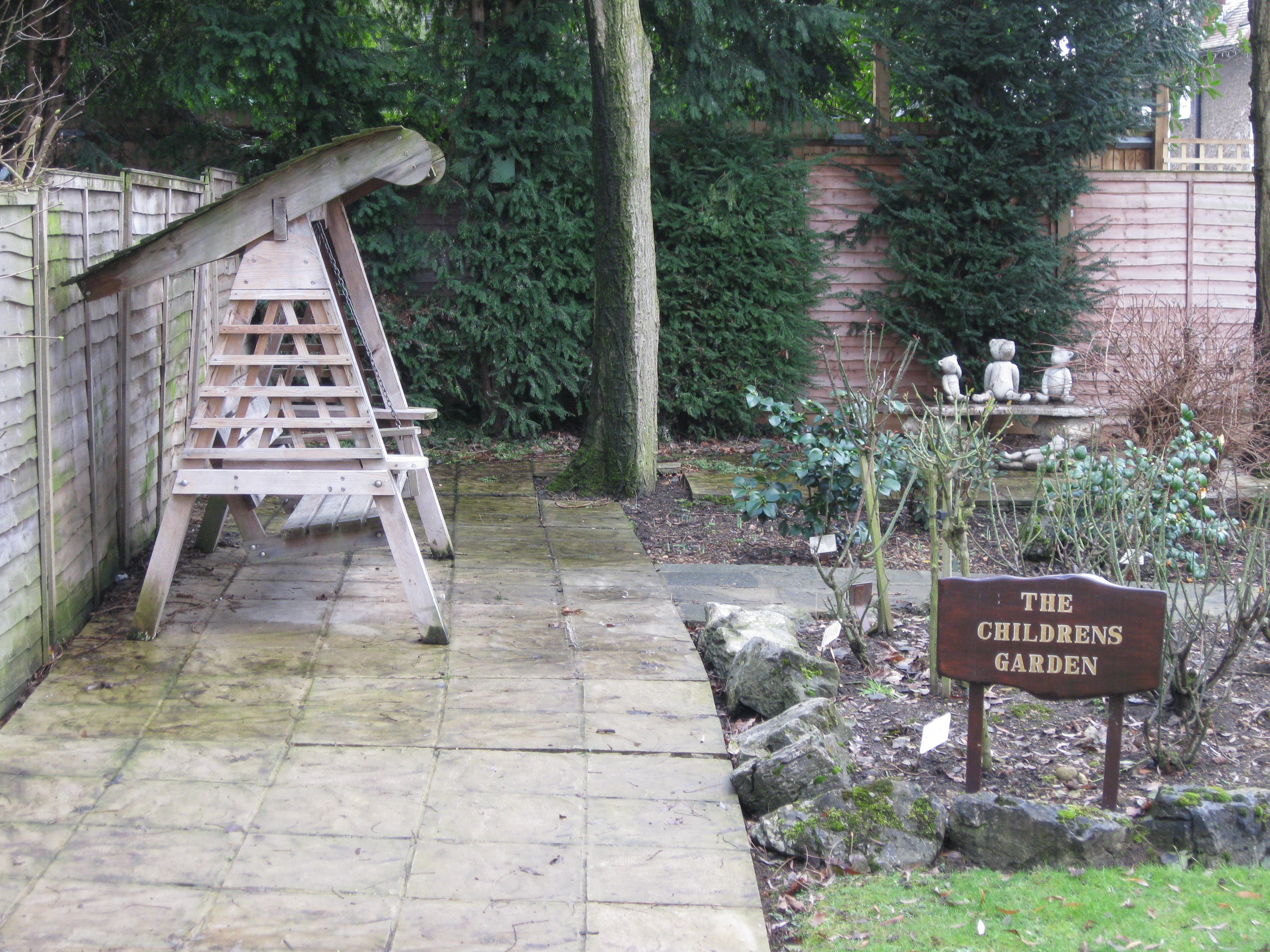
The Children's Garden

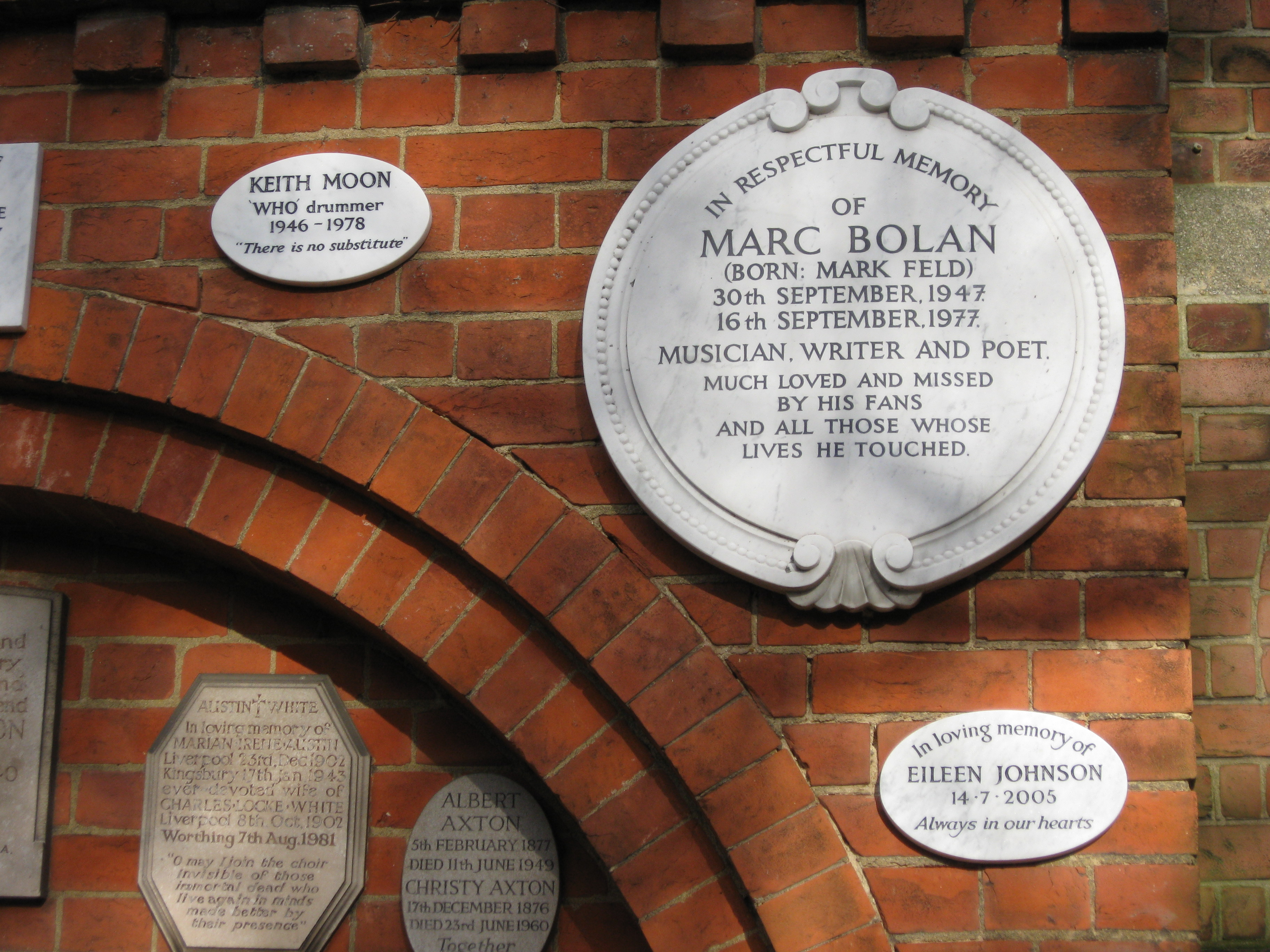
Memorial plaques to Marc Bolan and Keith Moon

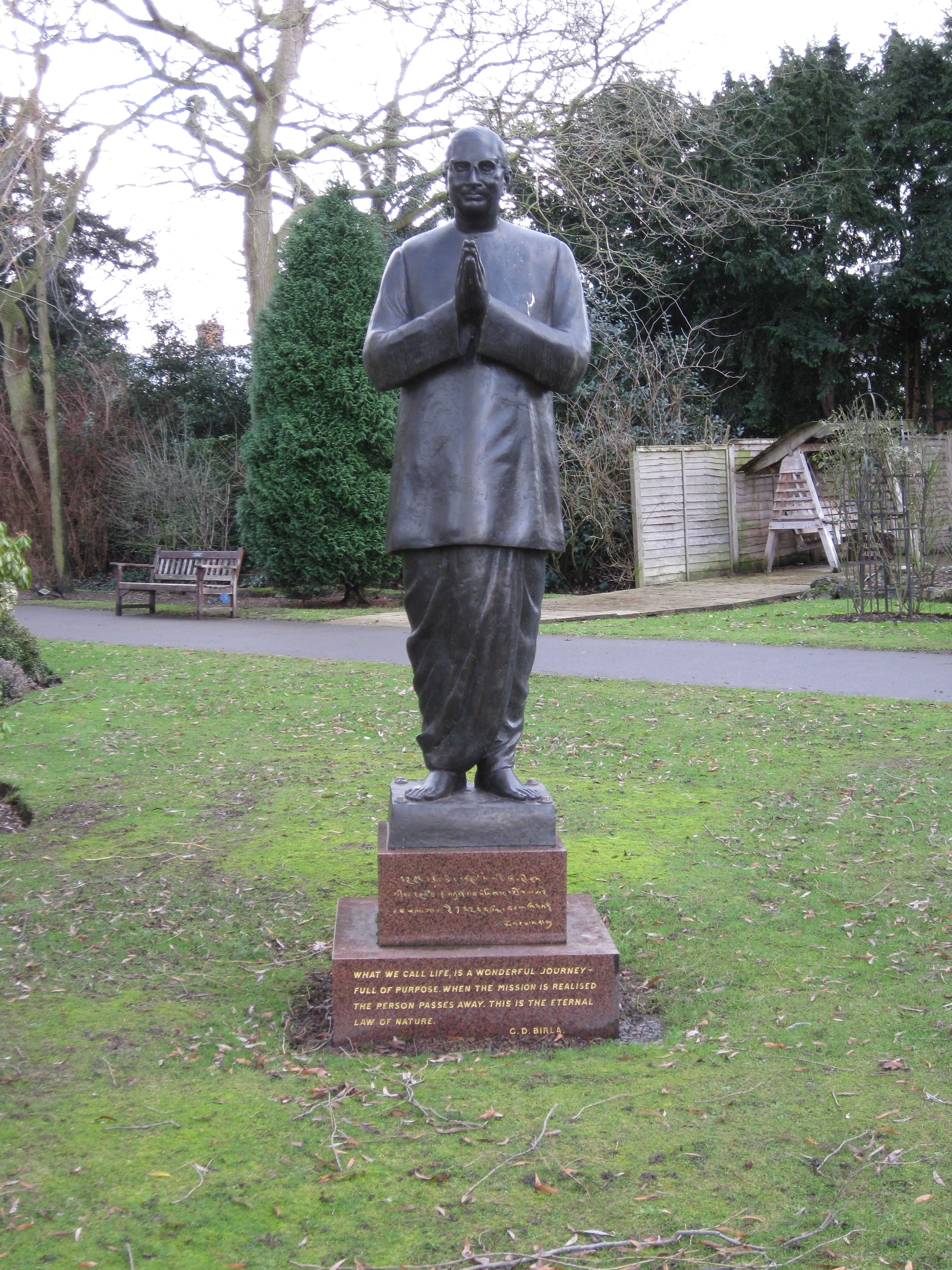
The statue of Ghanshyam Das Birla

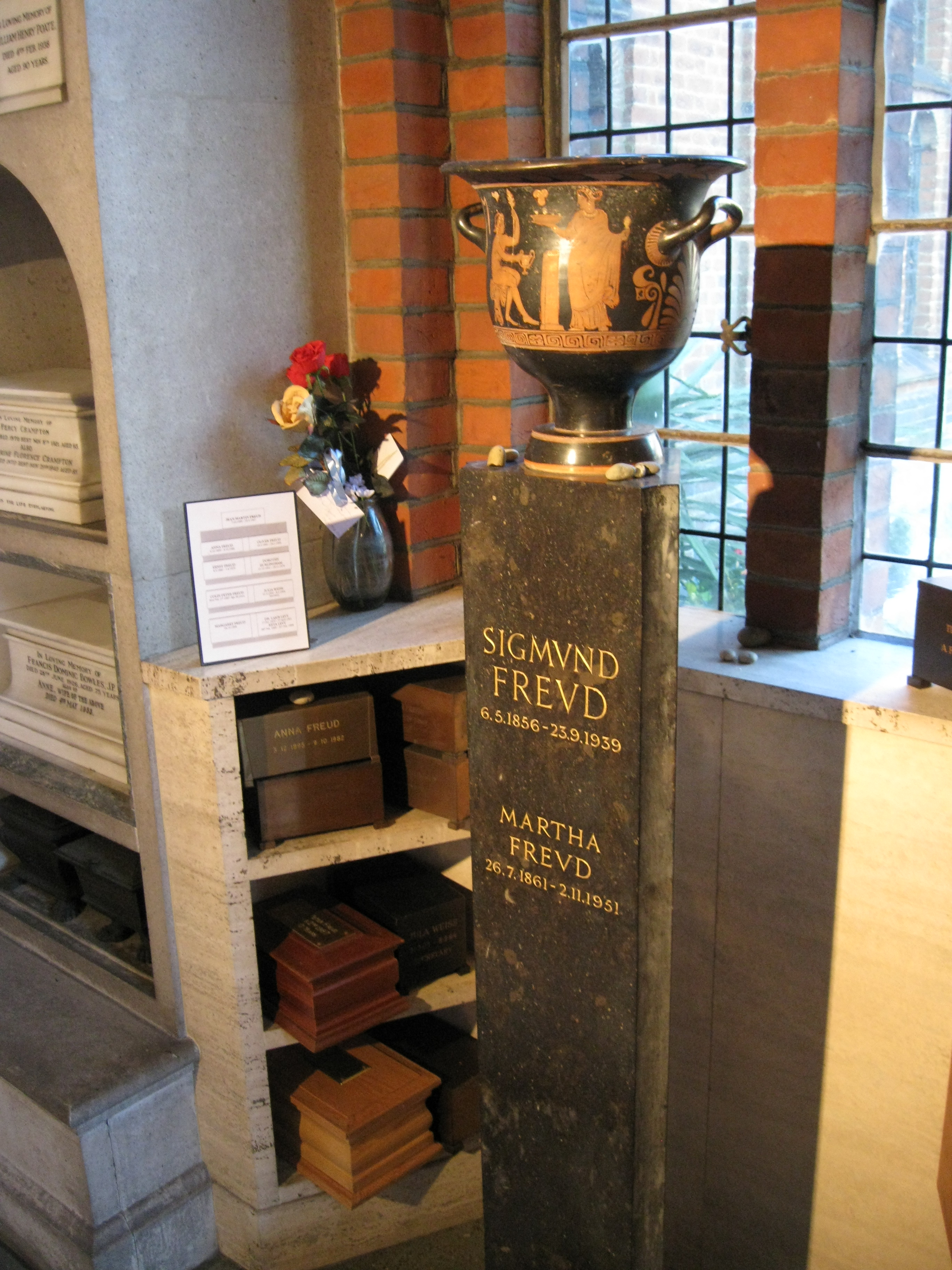
Freud Corner with the ancient Greek vase containing the ashes of Sigmund and Martha Freud

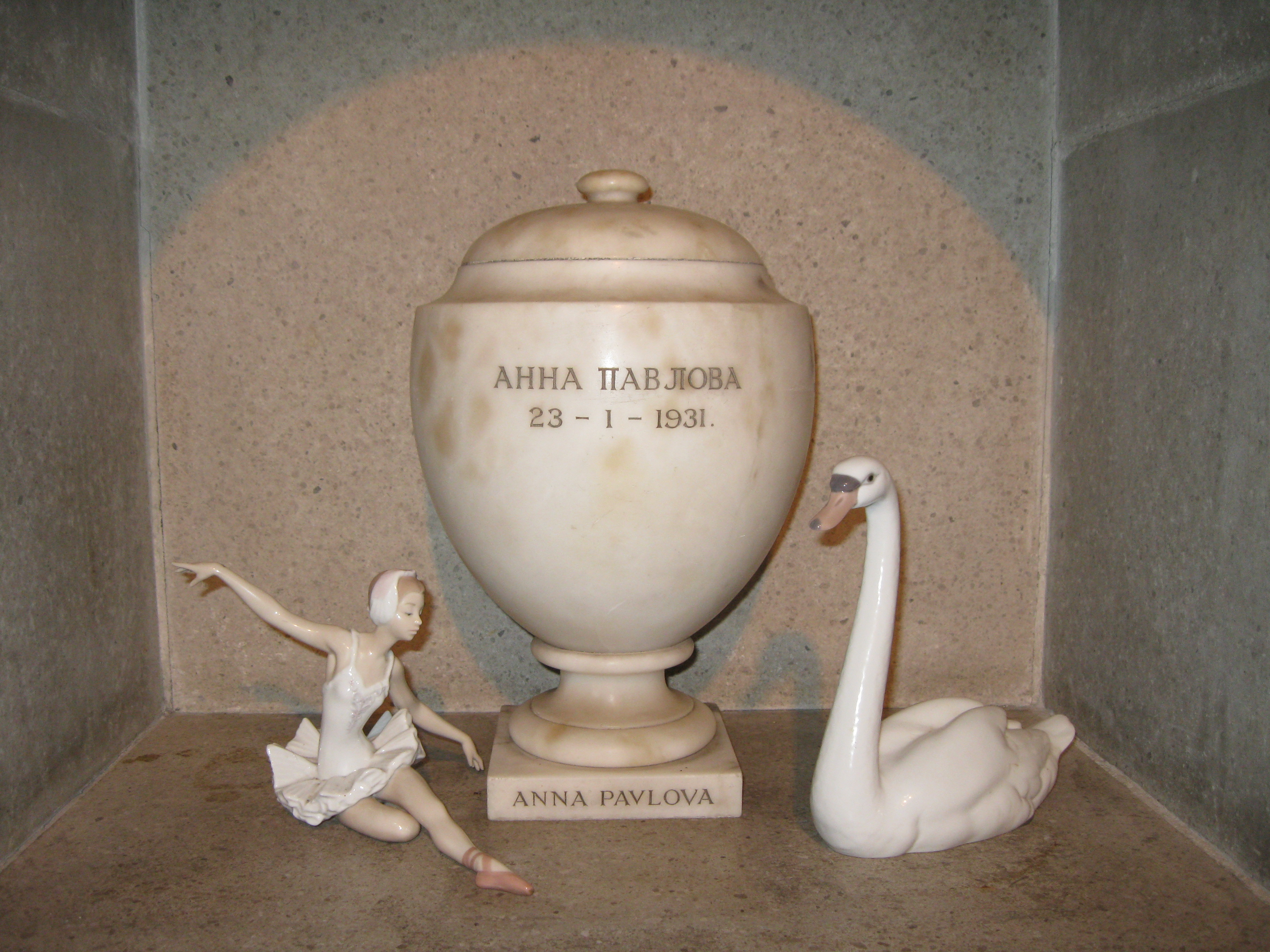
Urn with the ashes of Anna Pavlova

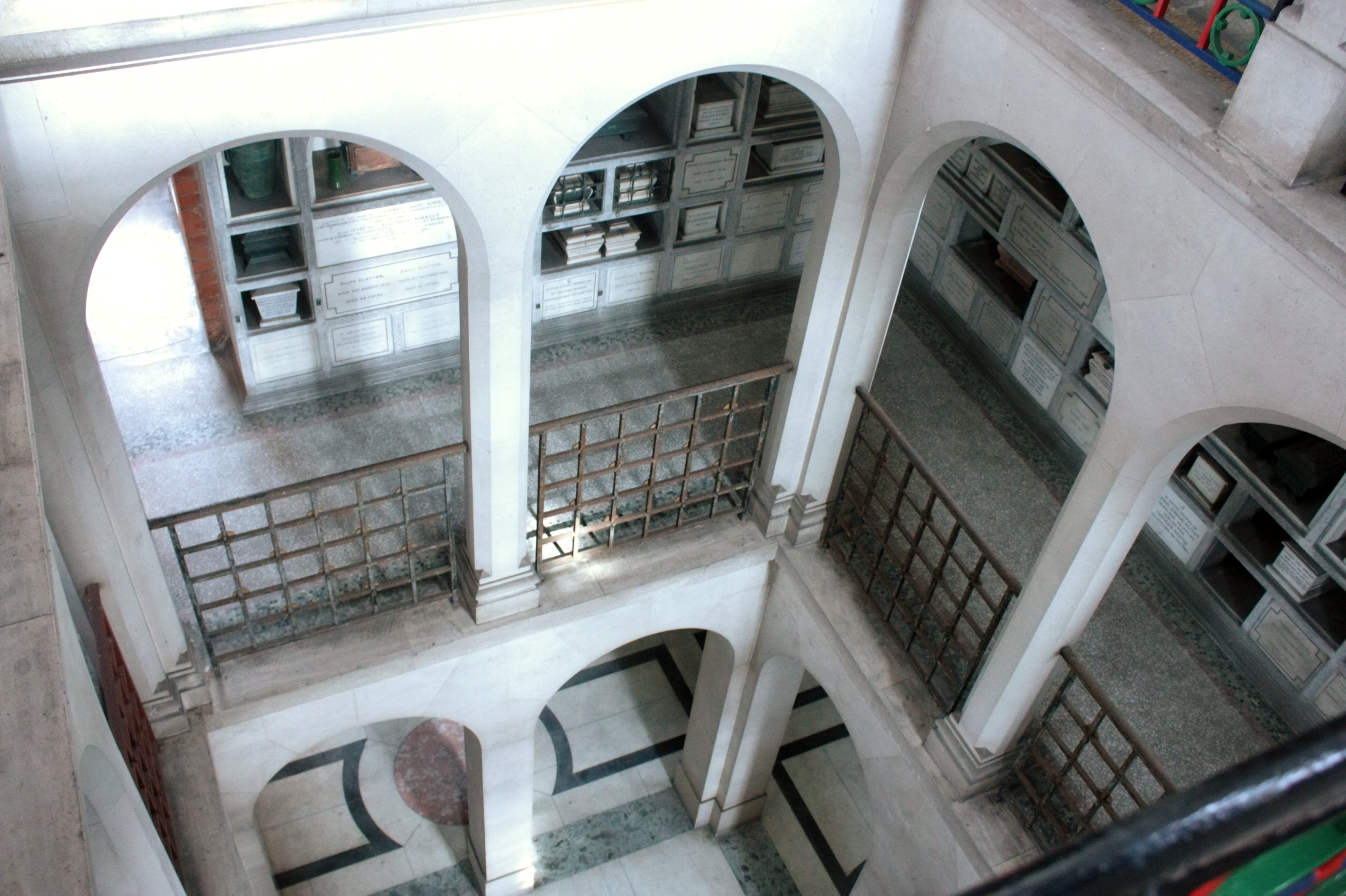
Interior of the columbarium
