= John Huston filmography =

Filmography of a director

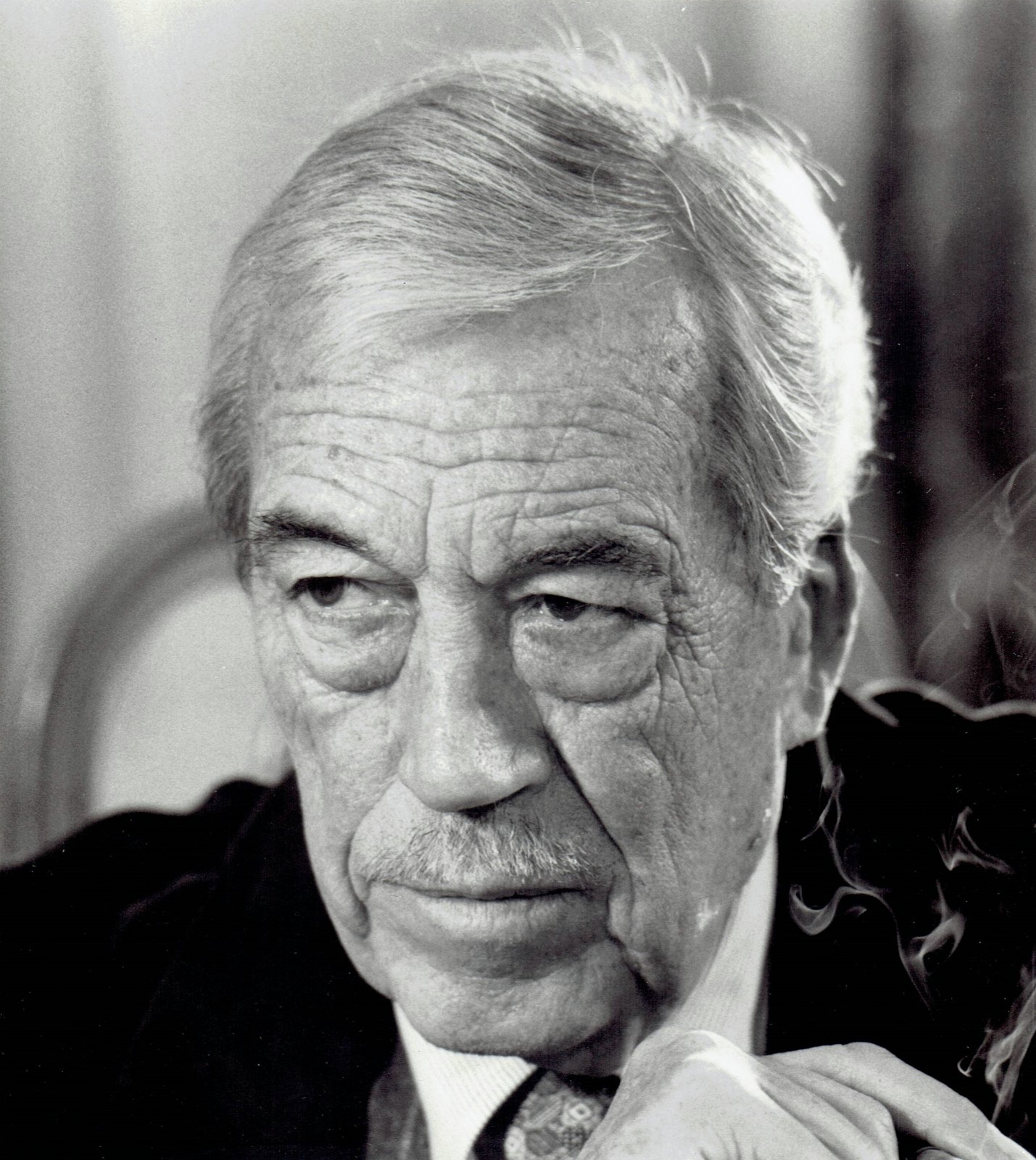
Huston on set in Winter Kills (1979)

John Huston (1906–1987) was an American and Irish filmmaker and actor. Praised as a "renaissance man" of American cinema, Huston directed 37 feature films over a career that lasted more than four decades, working in several genres including adventure, film noir, war drama, and western, establishing him as one of the leading filmmakers of Classic Hollywood. As an actor, Huston performed in over 30 roles. Many of his films were literary adaptations, often drawn from notable novels and stage works, and frequently engaged with what have been described as the "grand narratives" of the 20th century; author Ian Freer described him as "cinema’s Ernest Hemingway.

Huston began his film career as a screenwriter in the early 1930s. While working at Universal Pictures, he wrote the dialogue for several pre-Code films, including the 1932 features Murders in the Rue Morgue, A House Divided, and Law and Order. His writing career stalled after he killed actress Tosca Roulien in an automobile accident; after a four-year hiatus, he returned in 1937, working as a scriptwriter at Warner Brothers. Over the following years, he co-wrote several major films, including Jezebel (1938), Juarez (1939), Dr. Ehrlich's Magic Bullet (1940), and High Sierra, the latter of which starred Humphrey Bogart in one of his breakthrough roles.

Huston received his first Academy Award nomination for Best Original Screenplay for his work on Ehrlich. He received two writing nominations the following year, for Sergeant York and The Maltese Falcon, the latter of which was his directorial debut and is now regarded as an early touchstone of the film noir genre as well as one of the greatest films of all time; it also helped establish Bogart's status as a major leading man in Hollywood. Following the success of Falcon, Huston emerged as one of Warner Bros.’ leading directors. In 1942, he reunited with Humphrey Bogart for Across the Pacific and also directed In This Our Life starring Bette Davis. During World War II, Huston served in the United States Army, where he directed several films for the Army Signal Corps, including Report from the Aleutians (1943), The Battle of San Pietro (1945), and Let There Be Light (1946).

After the war, Huston directed The Treasure of the Sierra Madre (1948), which was adapted from the 1927 novel by B. Traven and starred Humphrey Bogart alongside Huston’s father, Walter Huston. The film was a critical and commercial success, with Huston receiving Academy Awards for Best Director and Best Adapted Screenplay and his father winning for Best Supporting Actor. He followed this success with Key Largo (1948), where he reunited with Bogart for the fourth and final time, this time with Lauren Bacall. Over the following decades, Huston remained one of Hollywood's most acclaimed directors, directing films such as The Asphalt Jungle (1950), The African Queen (1951), The Misfits (1961), and The Man Who Would Be King (1975). His final film was The Dead (1987).

== Films directed ==
=== Feature films ===
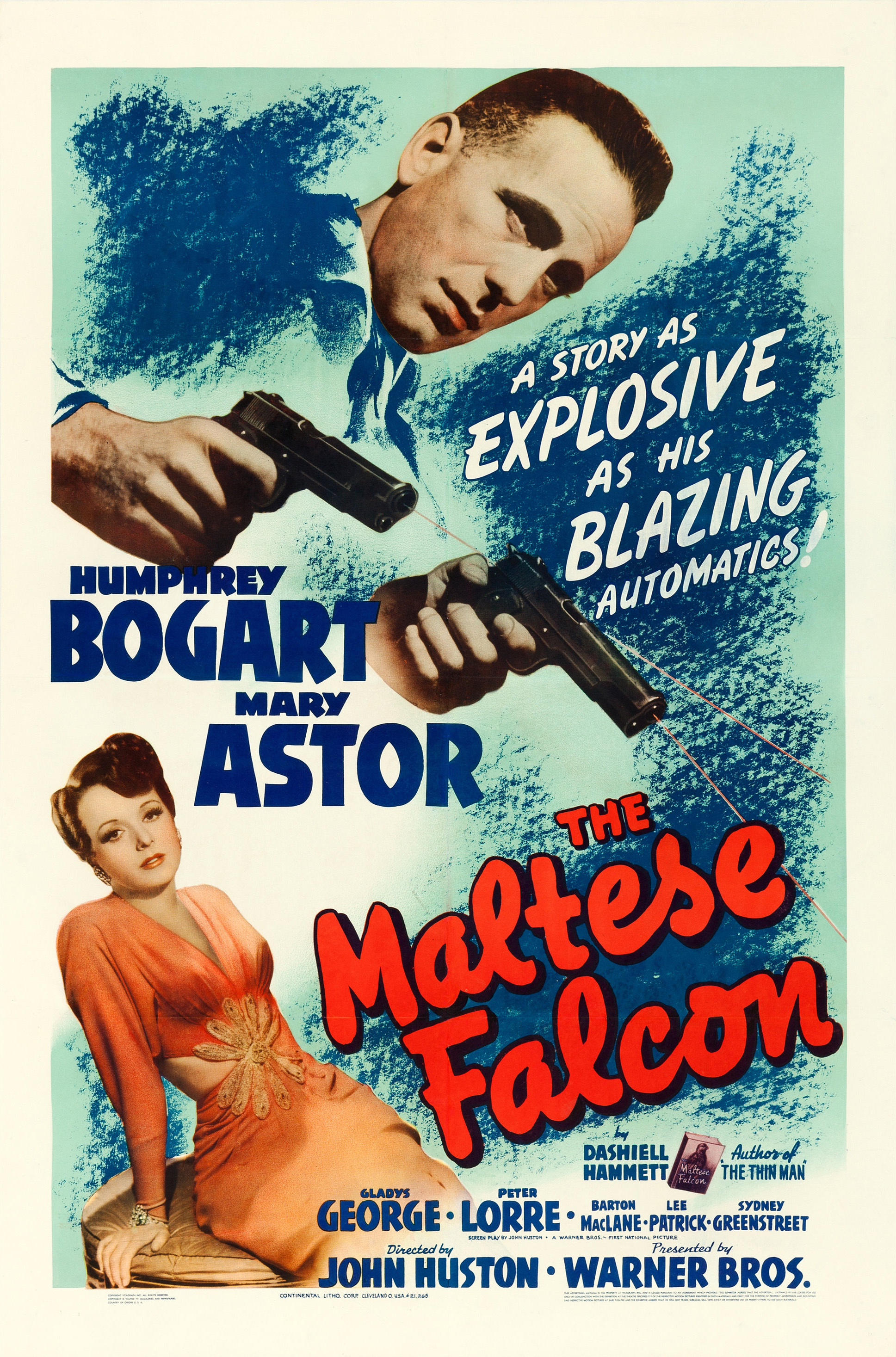
Poster for the theatrical run of The Maltese Falcon

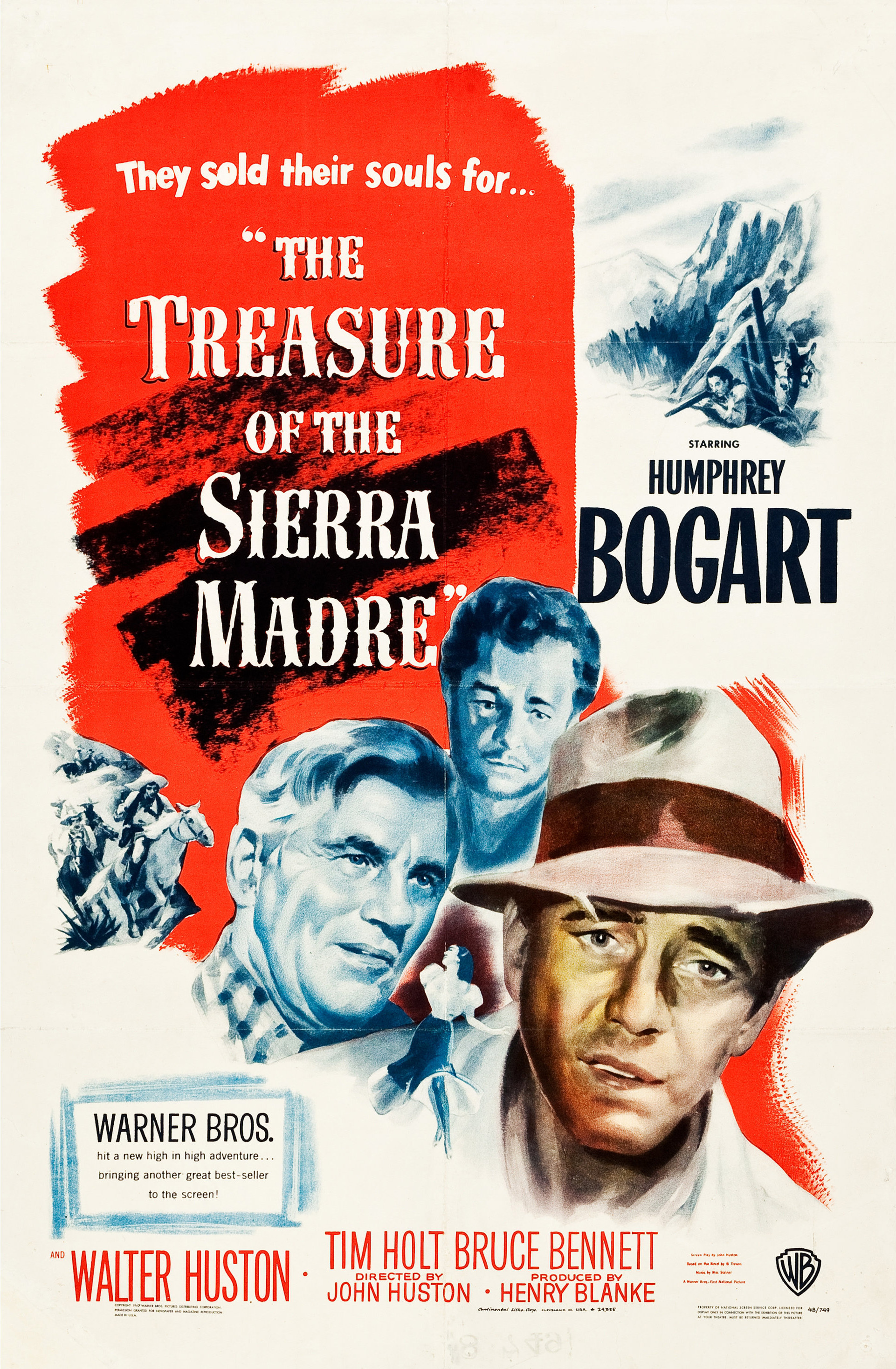
Poster for The Treasure of the Sierra Madre

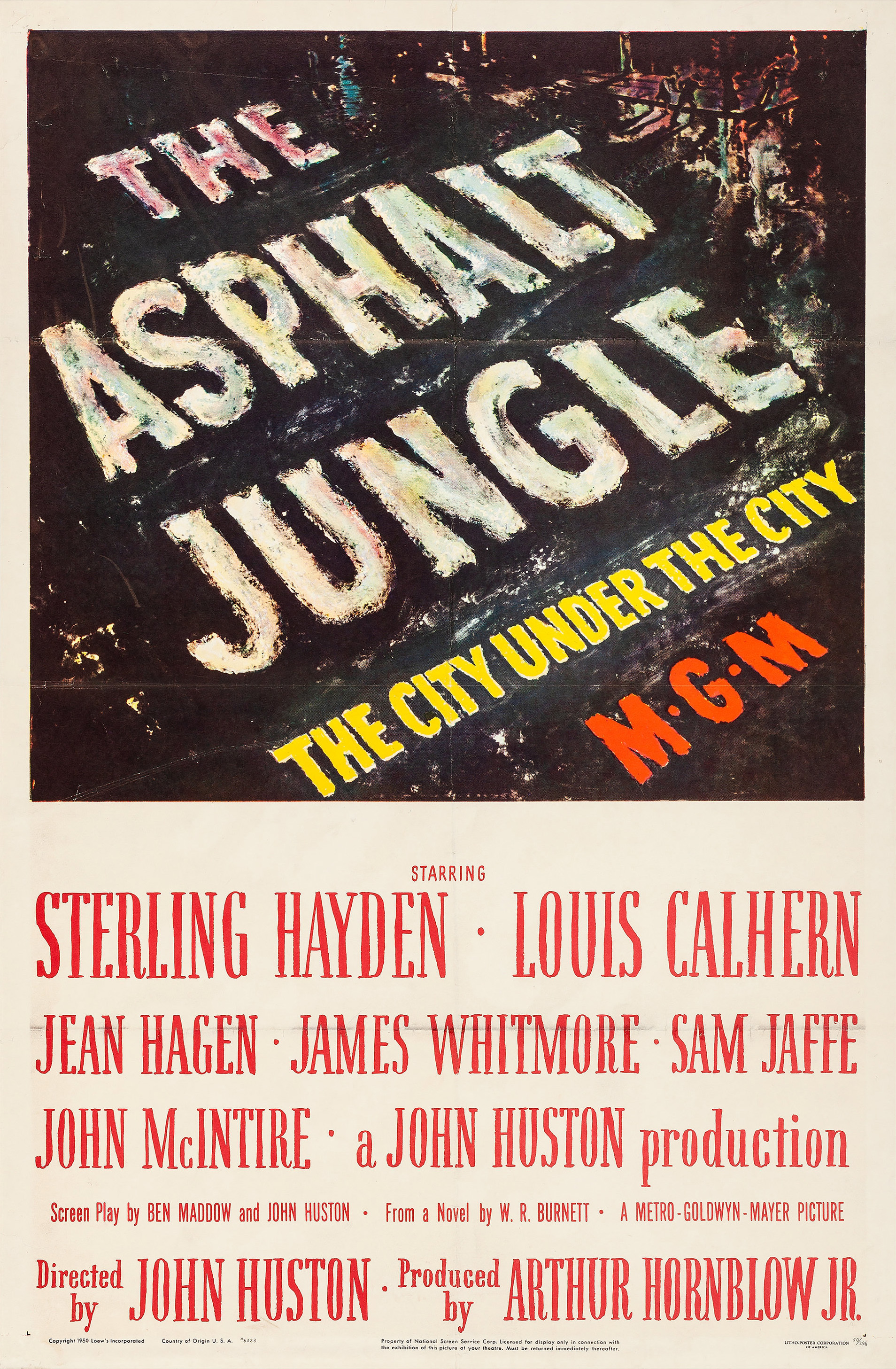
Poster for The Asphalt Jungle

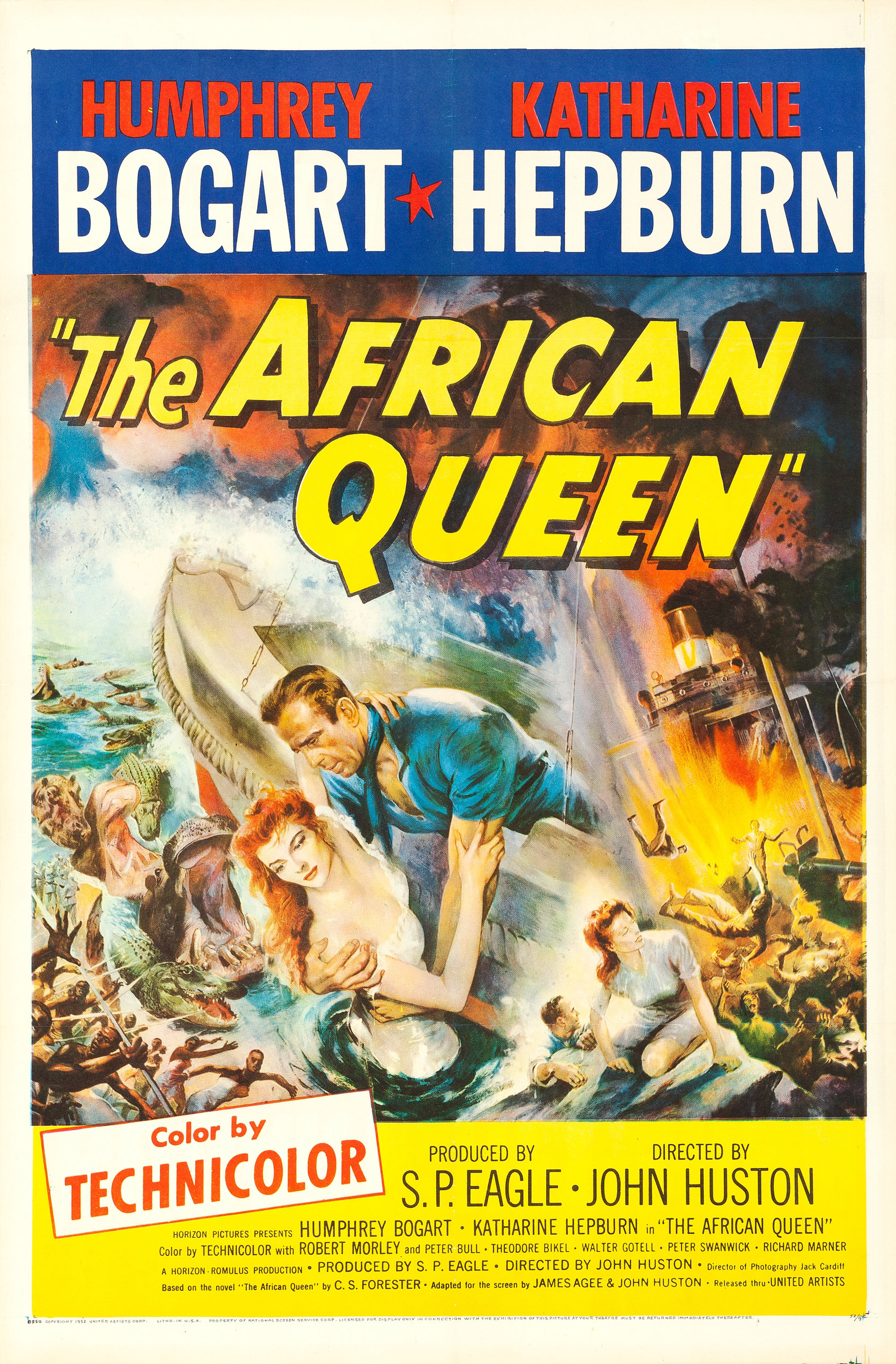
US theatrical release poster for The African Queen

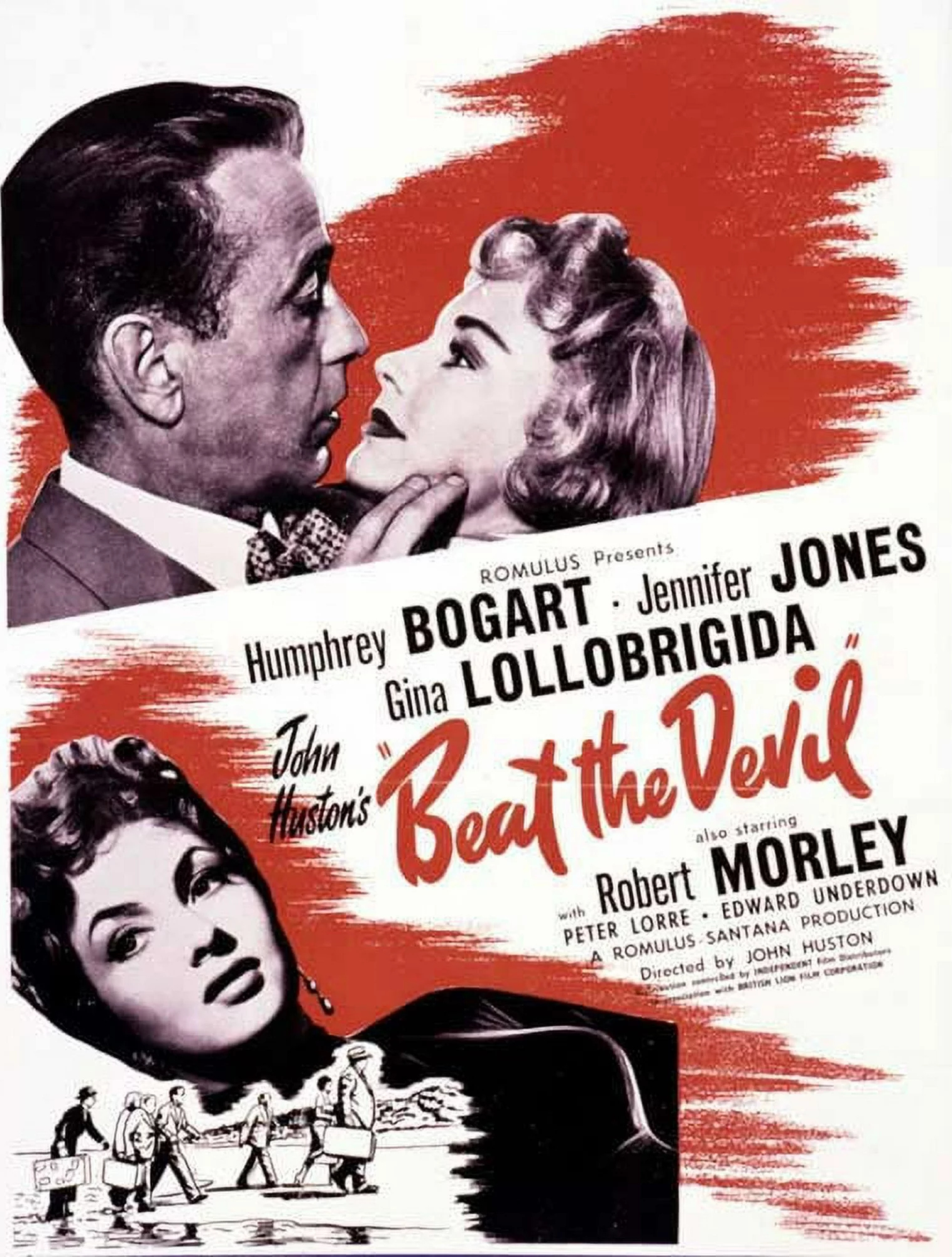
Poster for Beat the Devil

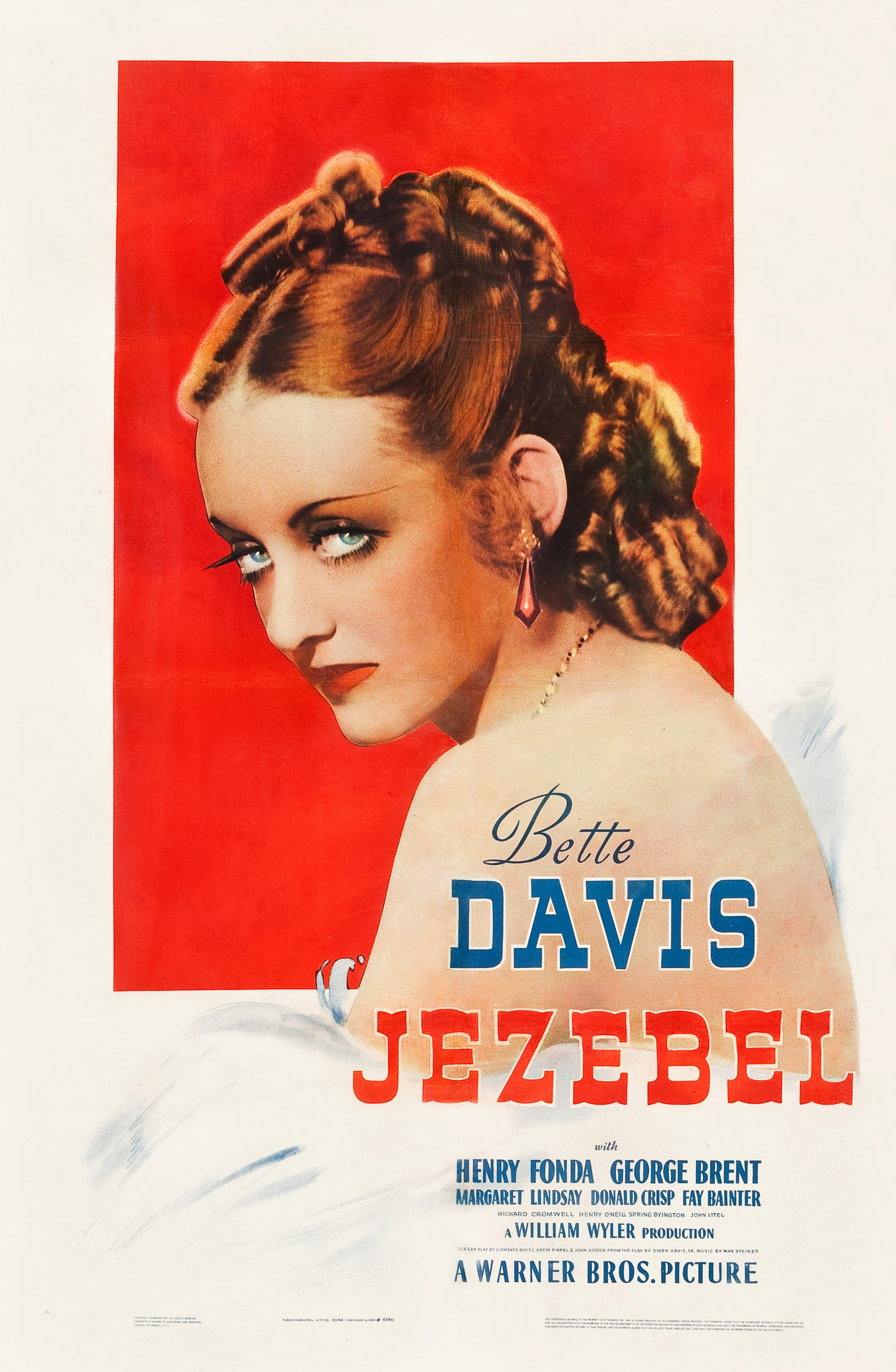
Theatrical release poster for Jezebel

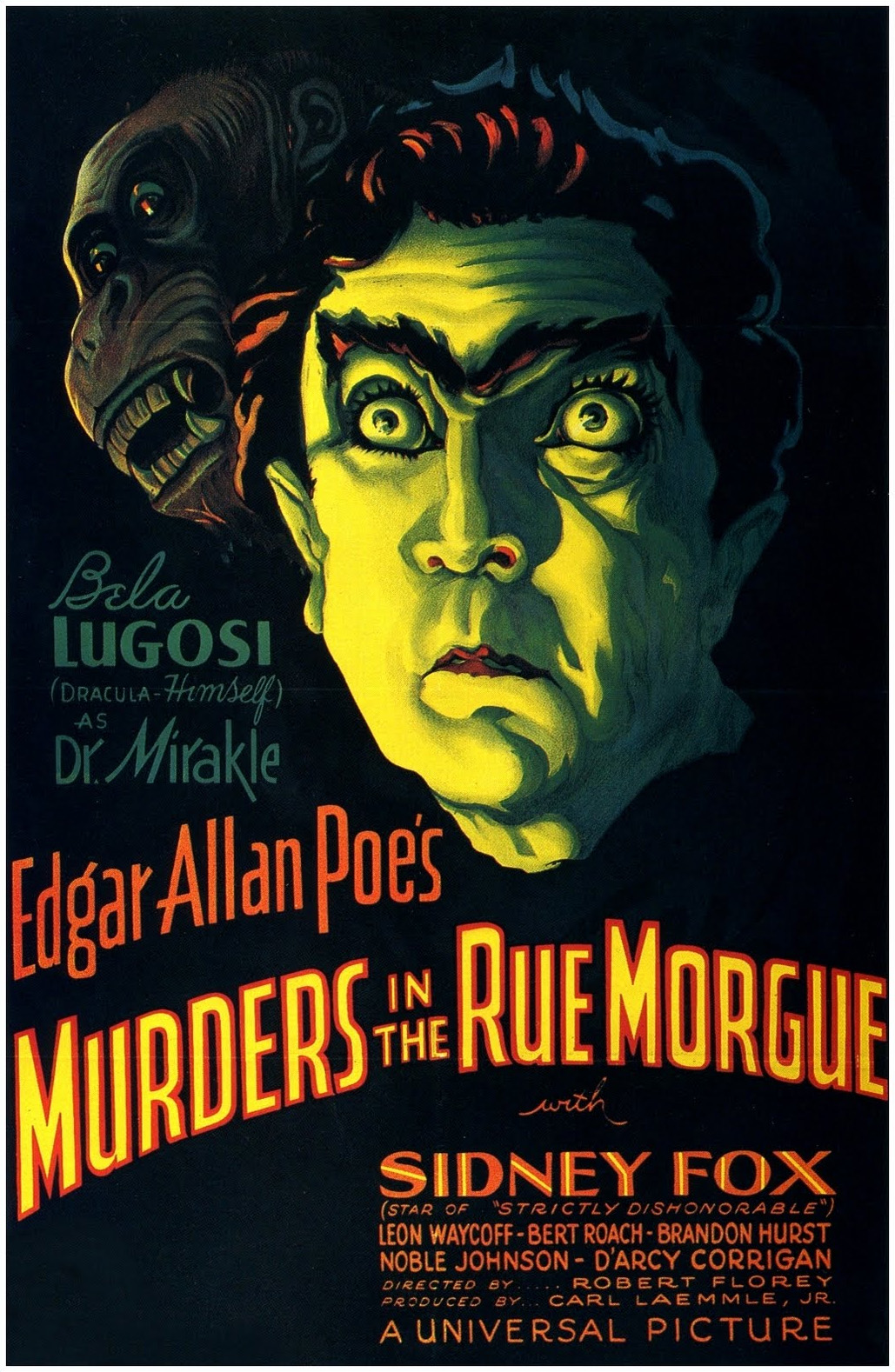
Theatrical release poster for Murders in the Rue Morgue

Films directed
Year	Title	Functioned as				Notes	Ref.
Year	Title	Director	Producer	Writer	Actor	Notes	Ref.
1941	The Maltese Falcon	Yes	No	Yes	No	The third film adaptation of Dashiell Hammett’s 1930 novel, following the 1931 version directed by Roy Del Ruth and the 1936 film Satan Met a Lady directed by William Dieterle	
1942	In This Our Life	Yes	No	No	No	Based on Ellen Glasgow's 1941 novel of the same title	
1942	Across the Pacific	Yes	No	No	No	Replaced for the last two weeks of filming by Vincent Sherman; the screenplay by Richard Macauley was an adaptation of a 1941 Saturday Evening Post serial by Robert Carson	
1948	The Treasure of the Sierra Madre	Yes	No	Yes	Uncredited	Based on B. Traven's 1927 novel of the same name; Huston makes an uncredited appearance as the Man in White Suit	
1948	Key Largo	Yes	No	Yes	No	Co-written with Richard Brooks; based on Maxwell Anderson's 1939 play of the same name	
1948	On Our Merry Way	Uncredited	No	No	No	At the time of its release, King Vidor and Leslie Fenton were credited as the film's directors. Later DVD releases also credited Huston and George Stevens, who assisted with one of the film's segments.	
1949	We Were Strangers	Yes	Yes	Yes	Uncredited	Co-written with Peter Viertel; Huston has an uncredited appearance as Señor Muñoz	
1950	The Asphalt Jungle	Yes	Yes	Yes	No	Co-written with Ben Maddow; based on W. R. Burnett's 1949 novel	
1951	The Red Badge of Courage	Yes	No	Yes	No	Co-written with Albert Band; based on Stephen Crane's 1895 novel of the same name	
1951	The African Queen	Yes	Yes	Yes	No	Co-written with James Agee; based on C. S. Forester's 1935 novel of the same name	
1952	Moulin Rouge	Yes	Yes	Yes	No	Co-written with Anthony Veiller; based on Pierre La Mure's 1950 novel of the same name	
1953	Beat the Devil	Yes	No	Yes	No	Co-written with Truman Capote; loosely based on Claud Cockburn's 1951 novel of the same name	
1956	Moby Dick	Yes	No	Yes	Uncredited	Co-written with Ray Bradbury; Huston makes an uncredited appearance as the Ship’s Lookout	
1957	Heaven Knows, Mr. Allison	Yes	No	Yes	No	Co-written with John Lee Mahin; based on Charles Shaw's 1952 novel of the same name	
1958	The Barbarian and the Geisha	Yes	No	No	No	Screenplay by Charles Grayson; story by Ellis St. Joseph	
1958	The Roots of Heaven	Yes	No	No	No	Screenplay by Romain Gary and Patrick Leigh Fermor; based on Romain Gary's 1956 novel of the same name	
1960	The Unforgiven	Yes	No	No	No	The final production by Hecht-Hill-Lancaster; written by Ben Maddow and David Wolff; based on Alan Le May's 1957 novel of the same name	
1961	The Misfits	Yes	Yes	No	No	Screenplay by Arthur Miller, who adapted his own 1957 short story	
1962	Freud: The Secret Passion	Yes	No	No	Uncredited	Screenplay by Charles Kaufman and Wolfgang Reinhardt; Huston appears as the uncredited narrator	
1963	The List of Adrian Messenger	Yes	No	No	Uncredited	Screenplay by Anthony Veiller; based on Philip MacDonald's 1959 novel of the same name; Huston appears as Lord Ashton	
1964	The Night of the Iguana	Yes	No	Yes	No	Co-written with Anthony Veiller; based on Tennessee Williams' 1961 play of the same name	
1966	The Bible: In the Beginning...	Yes	No	No	Yes	Screenplay by Christopher Fry; includes additional material by Orson Welles, Ivo Perilli, Jonathan Griffin, Mario Soldati and Vittorio Bonicelli; based on the Book of Genesis; Huston appears in the dual roles of Noah and God, as well as a narrator	
1967	Reflections in a Golden Eye	Yes	No	No	No	Screenplay by Chapman Mortimer and Gladys Hill; based on Carson McCullers's 1941 novel of the same name	
1967	Casino Royale	Yes	No	No	Yes	Co-directed with Ken Hughes, Joseph McGrath, Robert Parrish, and Val Guest; screenplay by Wolf Mankowitz, John Law, and Michael Sayers; loosely based on Ian Fleming's 1953 novel Casino Royale, the first in the James Bond book series; Huston appears as M, the Chief of the Secret Intelligence Service for MI6	
1969	Sinful Davey	Yes	Yes	No	No	Screenplay by James R. Webb; based on David Haggart's novel The Life of David Haggart; Huston's daughter Anjelica Huston appears uncredited as an extra	
1969	A Walk with Love and Death	Yes	No	No	Yes	Screenplay by Dale Wasserman; based on Hans Koningsberger's 1961 novel of the same title; Huston appears as Robert the Elder	
1970	The Kremlin Letter	Yes	No	No	Yes	Co-written with Gladys Hill; adapted from Noel Behn's 1966 novel of the same title; Huston appears as the Admiral	
1972	Fat City	Yes	Yes	Yes	No	Adapted by Leonard Gardner from his 1969 novel of the same title	
1972	The Life and Times of Judge Roy Bean	Yes	No	No	Yes	Screenplay by John Milius; loosely based on the life of Roy Bean; Huston appears as Grizzly Adams	
1973	The Mackintosh Man	Yes	Yes	No	No	Screenplay by Walter Hill; based on Desmond Bagley's novel The Freedom Trap	
1975	The Man Who Would Be King	Yes	No	Yes	No	Co-written with Gladys Hill; adapted from Rudyard Kipling's 1888 novella; development originally began in the late-1950s.	
1976	Independence	Yes	No	No	No	Short docudrama for the National Park Service. Screenplay by Tom McGrath, Joyce Ritter, and Lloyd Ritter	
1979	Wise Blood	Yes	No	No	Yes	Screenplay by Benedict Fitzgerald and Michael Fitzgerald; based on Flannery O'Connor's 1952 novel of the same name; Huston appears as the grandfather	
1980	Phobia	Yes	No	No	No	Screenplay by Peter Bellwood, Lew Lehman and Jimmy Sangster from a story by Ronald Shusett and Gary Sherman; Huston's only horror film and his only film produced in Canada	
1981	Escape to Victory	Yes	No	No	No	Screenplay by Evan Jones and Yabo Yablonsky from a story by Yahoo Yablonsky, Djordje Milićević, and Jeff Maguire; based on Zoltán Fábri's 1961 novel Two Half Times in Hell	
1982	Annie	Yes	No	No	Uncredited	Screenplay by Carol Sobieski based on Charles Strouse, Martin Charnin and Thomas Meehan's 1977 musical of the same name, which in turn was based on Harold Gray's Little Orphan Annie comic strip; Huston appears in the uncredited role of Actor on Radio	
1984	Under the Volcano	Yes	No	No	No	Adapted by Guy Gallo from Malcolm Lowry's semi-autobiographical 1947 novel	
1985	Prizzi's Honor	Yes	No	No	No	Co-written by Richard Condon based on Condon's 1982 novel of the same name	
1987	The Dead	Yes	No	No	No	Screenplay by Huston's son Tony Huston; an adaptation of James Joyce's 1914 short story of the same name	

=== Documentaries ===
Documentary
Year	Title	Director	Writer	Other	Notes	Ref.
1942	Winning Your Wings	Yes	No	No	Co-directed with Owen Crump (uncredited)	
1943	Report from the Aleutians	Yes	No	Yes	Also writer (uncredited), producer, editor (uncredited), and co-narrator	
1944	Tunisian Victory	Yes	No	No	Co-directed with Frank Capra, John Huston, Anthony Veiller, Hugh Stewart and Roy Boulting	
1945	The Battle of San Pietro	Yes	Yes	Yes	Also narrator and editor (uncredited); the film was released in 1945 but shown to military personnel earlier	
1945	Know Your Enemy: Japan	No	Yes	No	The film's completion was delayed by disputes between Hollywood and the U.S. military; Huston was initially considered to direct the film before Frank Capra and Joris Ivens themselves took the role.	
1981	Let There Be Light	Yes	Uncredited	No	Completed 1946–48; co-written with Charles Kaufman; featuring narration by Huston's father Walter Huston	

=== Unrealized projects ===
Uncompleted films
Year	Title	Notes	Ref.
1957	A Farewell to Arms	Producer David O. Selznick hired Huston to direct the project, but after Selznick expressed concerns over delays, Huston withdrew and Charles Vidor was brought in as his replacement	
1971	The Last Run	Huston was dissatisfied with the screenplay, and production was marked by creative disagreements between Huston and lead actor George C. Scott. Huston left the project, which was completed by Richard Fleischer.	
1979	Love and Bullets	Huston withdrew from the project following disagreements with the producers after filming several scenes. Stuart Rosenberg subsequently completed the project.	

== Other film work ==
Other films work
Year	Title	Functioned as		Director	Notes	Ref.
Year	Title	Producer	Writer	Director	Notes	Ref.
1930	The Storm	No	Yes	William Wyler	Universal Pictures; with Charles Logue, Langdon McCormick, Tom Reed and Wells Root	
1931	A House Divided	No	Yes	William Wyler	Universal Pictures; with John B. Clymer, Olive Edens and Dale Van Every	
1932	Murders in the Rue Morgue	No	Yes	Robert Florey	Universal Pictures; based on Edgar Allan Poe's 1841 short story; with Tom Reed and Dale Van Every	
1932	Law and Order	No	Yes	Edward L. Cahn	Universal Pictures; with Tom Reed and Richard Schayer	
1935	Death Drives Through	No	Yes	Edward L. Cahn	Associated British; with Katherine Strueby and Gordon Wellesley	
1935	It Happened in Paris	No	Yes	Robert Wyler	Associated British; with Katherine Strueby and H. F. Maltby	
1938	The Amazing Dr. Clitterhouse	No	Yes	Anatole Litvak	Warner Bros. Pictures; based on the 1936 play of the same name; with John Wexley	
1938	Jezebel	No	Yes	William Wyler	Warner Bros. Pictures; with Clements Ripley, Abem Finkel and Robert Buckner	
1939	Juarez	No	Yes	William Dieterle	Warner Bros. Pictures; based on Bertita Harding's 1934 biography The Phantom Crown and Franz Werfel's 1925 play Juarez and Maximilian; with Aeneas MacKenzie and Wolfgang Reinhardt	
1939	Wuthering Heights	No	Uncredited	William Wyler	United Artists; based on Emily Brontë's 1847 novel of the same name; with Charles MacArthur and Ben Hecht	
1940	Dr. Ehrlich's Magic Bullet	No	Yes	William Dieterle	Warner Bros. Pictures; with Norman Burnstine and Heinz Herald	
1941	High Sierra	No	Yes	Raoul Walsh	Warner Bros. Pictures; with W. R. Burnett	
1941	Sergeant York	No	Yes	Howard Hawks	Warner Bros. Pictures; based on York's diary Sergeant York: His Own Life Story and War Diary as edited by Tom Skeyhill; with Abem Finkel, Harry Chandler and Howard Koch	
1946	The Killers	No	Yes	Robert Siodmak	Universal Pictures; uncredited; based in part on Ernest Hemingway's 1927 short story of the same name; with Anthony Veiller and Richard Brooks	
1946	Three Strangers	No	Yes	Jean Negulesco	Warner Bros. Pictures; with Howard Koch	
1946	The Stranger	No	Yes	Orson Welles	Uncredited; with Anthony Veiller, Victor Trivas and Decla Dunning. Producer Sam Spiegel intended to hire Huston to direct, but Welles was selected after Huston entered military service.	
1951	The Prowler	Uncredited	No	Joseph Losey	United Artists; uncredited; produced by Sam Spiegel and featured an uncredited producing contribution from Huston	
1988	Mr. North	Yes	Yes	Danny Huston	The Samuel Goldwyn Company; based on Thornton Wilder's 1973 novel Theophilus North; co-written with Janet Roach and James Costigan	

== Acting roles ==
=== Film ===
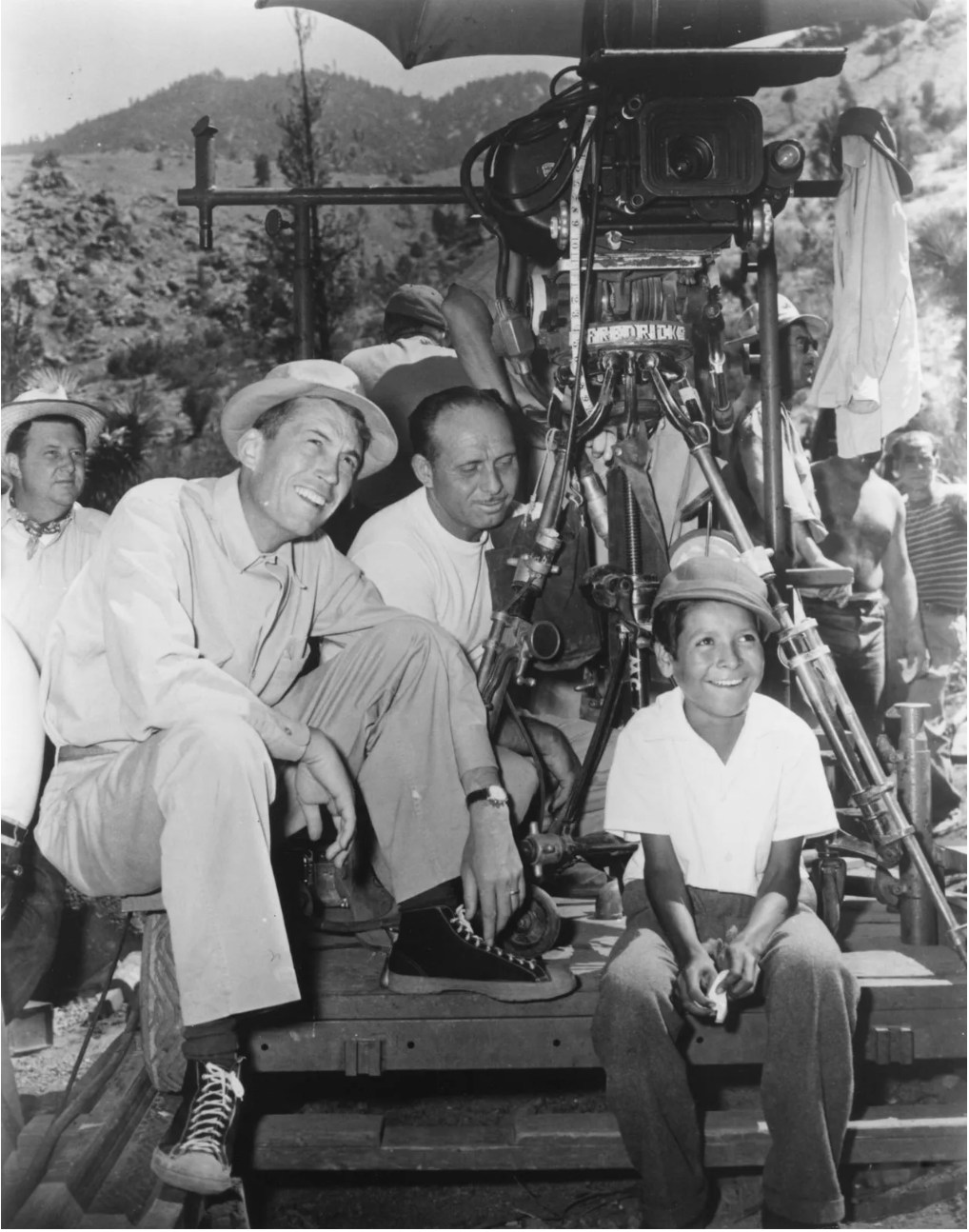
Huston (left) on the set of The Treasure of the Sierra Madre

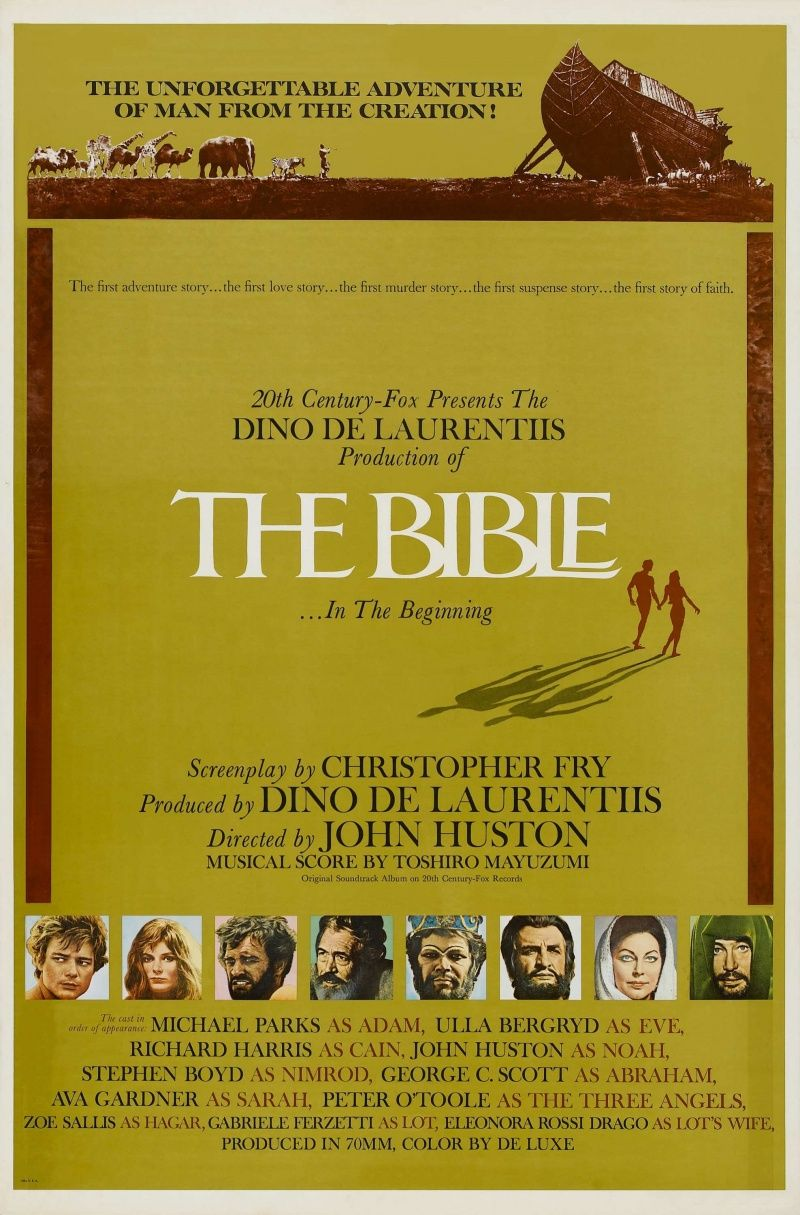
Theatrical poster for The Bible... In the Beginning, in which Huston plays a several roles

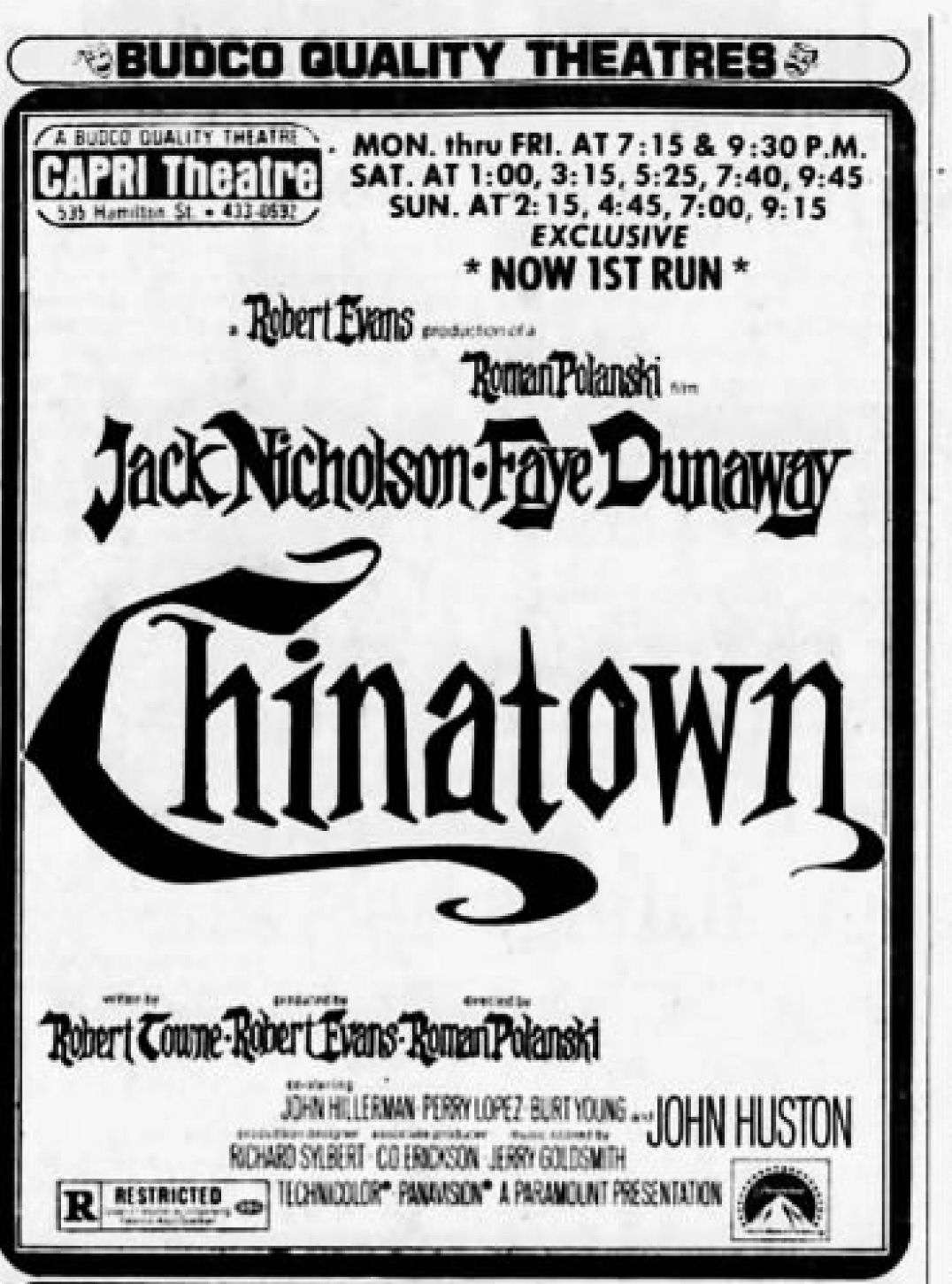
Theater advertisement for Chinatown, in which Huston plays a supporting role

Acting roles
Year	Title	Role	Notes	Ref.
1929	The Shakedown	Extra	Uncredited	
1948	The Treasure of the Sierra Madre	Man in White Suit	Uncredited cameo	
1949	We Were Strangers	Señor Muñoz	Uncredited cameo	
1956	Moby Dick	Ship's Lookout	Uncredited	
1962	Freud: The Secret Passion	Narrator (voice)	Uncredited	
1962	The List of Adrian Messenger	Lord Ashton	Uncredited	
1963	The Cardinal	Cardinal Lawrence Glennon		
1966	The Bible: In the Beginning	Noah / God / Narrator (voice)		
1966	The Legend of Marilyn Monroe	Narrator (voice)		
1967	Casino Royale	M		
1968	Candy	Dr. Arnold Dunlap		
1969	De Sade	The Abbe		
1969	A Walk with Love and Death	Robert the Elder		
1970	The Kremlin Letter	Admiral		
1970	Myra Breckinridge	Buck Loner		
1971	The Bridge in the Jungle	Sleigh		
1971	The Deserter	General Miles		
1971	Man in the Wilderness	Captain Henry		
1972	The Life and Times of Judge Roy Bean	Grizzly Adams		
1973	Battle for the Planet of the Apes	The Lawgiver		
1974	Chinatown	Noah Cross		
1975	Breakout	Harris Wagner		
1975	The Wind and the Lion	Secretary of State John Hay		
1977	Tentacles	Ned Turner		
1977	Angela	Hogan		
1978	The Greatest Battle	Sean O'Hara		
1978	The Bermuda Triangle	Edward Marvin		
1979	The Visitor	Jerzy Colsowicz		
1979	Winter Kills	Pa Kegan		
1979	Wise Blood	Grandfather		
1979	Jaguar Lives!	Ralph Richards		
1980	Head On	Clarke Hill		
1982	Cannery Row	Narrator (voice)		
1982	Annie	Actor on Radio	Uncredited	
1983	Lovesick	Larry Geller, M.D.		
1983	A Minor Miracle	Father Cardenas		
1984	Epic	Narrator (voice)	US version only	
1985	The Black Cauldron	Narrator (voice)		
1986	Momo	Meister Hora		
2018	The Other Side of the Wind	Jake Hannaford	Filmed between 1974 and 1975	

=== Television ===
Television
Year	Title	Role	Format
1976	Sherlock Holmes in New York	Professor Moriarty	TV movie
1977	The Rhinemann Exchange	Ambassador Henderson Granville	Miniseries; 3 episodes
1977	The Hobbit	Gandalf (voice)	TV movie
1978	The Word	Nathan Randall	Miniseries; 4 episodes
1980	The Return of the King	Gandalf (voice)	TV movie
1985	Alfred Hitchcock Presents	Carlos / Narrator (voice)	Episode: "Pilot"
1987	Mister Corbett's Ghost	The Collector	TV movie

== Stage ==
Stage
Year	Title	Functioned as			Notes	Ref.
Year	Title	Director	Writer	Actor	Notes	Ref.
1925	Ruint	No	No	Yes	Broadway debut; written by Hatcher Hughes and directed by James Light.	
1925	Adam Solitaire	No	No	Yes	Broadway production performed by eighteen Provincetown Players; written by Emjo Basshe and directed by Stanley Howlett	
1940	A Passenger to Bali	Yes	No	No	Ethel Barrymore Theatre production staged by Huston, written by Ellis St. Joseph, and produced by Montgomery Ford.	
1941	In Time to Come	No	Yes	No	Mansfield Theatre production writtne by Huston and Howard Koch	
1946	No Exit	Yes	No	No	Broadway production directed by Huston, written by Jean-Paul Sartre's	

== Bibliography ==
- Pratley, Gerald (1976). The Cinema of John Huston. Cranbury: A. S. Barnes. ISBN 0498014436.
- Huston, John (1980). An Open Book. London: Columbus. ISBN 0862878705.
- Brill, Lesley (1997). John Huston's Filmmaking. Cambridge University Press. ISBN 0521586704.
- Huston, John (2001). John Huston: Interviews. University Press of Mississippi. ISBN 9781578063284.
- McCarty, John (1987). The Films of John Huston. Citadel Press. ISBN 080651020X.
- Grobel, Lawrence (October 1989). The Hustons. Scribner. p. 812. ISBN 0-684190-19-2.
- Madsen, Axel (1978). John Huston: A Biography. Open Road Distribution. ISBN 9781504008587.
- Meyers, Jeffrey (2011). John Huston: Courage and Art. Crown Archetype. ISBN 9780307590671.
- Cohen, Allen; Lawton, Harry (1997). John Huston: A Guide to References and Resources. G.K. Hall. ISBN 9780816116195.
- Dewey, Donald (2014). James Stewart. Little, Brown Book Group. pp. 5–6. ISBN 9780751556889.
- Selznick, David O. (1972). Memo from David O. Selznick. Viking Press. pp. 442–443. ISBN 9780375755316.
- Ellis, David A. (2012). Conversations with Cinematographers. Bloomsbury Academic. ISBN 9780810881266.
- McGilligan, Patrick (1997). Backstory 3: Interviews with Screenwriters of the 1960s. University of California Press. ISBN 0520204263.
- Kaminsky, Stuart M. (1978). John Huston, Maker of Magic. Houghton Mifflin. ISBN 9780395257166.
- Schickel, Richard; Perry, George (2006). Bogie: A Celebration of the Life and Films of Humphrey Bogart. St. Martin's Press. ISBN 9780312366292.
- Willis, Donald, ed. (1985). Variety's Complete Science Fiction Reviews. Garland Publishing Inc. ISBN 9780824062637.
- Eagan, Daniel (2010). America's Film Legacy: The Authoritative Guide to the Landmark Movies in the National Film Registry. Bloomsbury Academic. ISBN 9780826429773.
- Segaloff, Nat (2025). Bogart and Huston: Their Lives, Their Adventures, and the Iconic Movies They Made Together. Pegasus Books. ISBN 9781639369324.
