= Freud (disambiguation) =

Sigmund Freud (1856–1939) was the inventor of psychoanalysis, psychosexual stages, and the personality theory of Ego, Superego, and Id.

Freud or Freudian may also refer to:

- Freudian slip

== Arts and entertainment ==
- Freud: The Secret Passion, a 1962 film by John Huston and starring Montgomery Clift
- Freud (miniseries), a 1984 mini-series starring David Suchet
- Freudian (album), a 2017 album by Daniel Caesar
- Freud (TV series), a 2020 Netflix series starring Swiss actress Ella Rumpf

== People with the surname ==
- The Freud family:
  - Jacob Freud (1815–1896), father of Sigmund
  - Amalia Nathansohn Freud (1835–1930), mother of Sigmund
  - Anna Freud (1895–1982), daughter of Sigmund, famous for contributions to child psychology and developmental psychology
  - Ernst Ludwig Freud (1892–1970), architect, son of Sigmund
    - Lucian Freud, Ernst's son, painter
      - Esther Freud, Lucian's daughter, novelist
      - Bella Freud, Lucian's daughter, fashion designer
    - Clement Freud, Ernst's son, English politician, writer, chef and raconteur
      - Matthew Freud, Clement's son, publicist
      - Emma Freud, Clement's daughter, journalist
  - Walter Freud (1921–2004), Sigmund's grandson, chemical engineer, member of Royal Pioneer Corps and British Special Operations Executive
    - David Freud, Baron Freud (b. 1950), Walter's son, journalist, businessman, Parliamentary Under Secretary of State for Work and Pensions
- Selma Freud (1877–?), Austrian physicist

== Other ==
- Freud (crater), a lunar crater
- Freud, a chimpanzee in the Kasakela community
