= 1980 New York Film Critics Circle Awards =

46th New York Film Critics Circle Awards

46th New York Film Critics Circle Awards

January 25, 1981

Best Film:
Ordinary People

The 46th New York Film Critics Circle Awards honored the best filmmaking of 1980. The winners were announced on 30 December 1980 and the awards were given on 25 January 1981.

== Winners ==
- Best Actor:
  - Robert De Niro - Raging Bull
  - Runners-up: Robert Duvall - The Great Santini and Peter O'Toole - The Stunt Man
- Best Actress:
  - Sissy Spacek - Coal Miner's Daughter
  - Runners-up: Goldie Hawn - Private Benjamin and Mary Tyler Moore - Ordinary People
- Best Cinematography:
  - Geoffrey Unsworth and Ghislain Cloquet - Tess
- Best Director:
  - Jonathan Demme - Melvin and Howard
  - Runners-up: Martin Scorsese - Raging Bull and Robert Redford - Ordinary People
- Best Documentary:
  - Best Boy
- Best Film:
  - Ordinary People
  - Runners-up: Melvin and Howard and Raging Bull
- Best Foreign Film:
  - Mon Oncle d'Amérique • France
  - Runners-up: Breaker Morant • Australia and Tess • France/UK
- Best Screenplay:
  - Bo Goldman - Melvin and Howard
  - Runners-up: Jean Gruault - Mon Oncle d'Amérique and John Sayles - Return of the Secaucus 7
- Best Supporting Actor:
  - Joe Pesci - Raging Bull
  - Runners-up: Jason Robards - Melvin and Howard and Timothy Hutton - Ordinary People'
- Best Supporting Actress:
  - Mary Steenburgen - Melvin and Howard
  - Runners-up: Debra Winger - Urban Cowboy and Mary Nell Santacroce - Wise Blood
