= List of accolades received by The Miracle Worker =

== Play (1959) ==
=== Organizations ===
| Organization | Category | Recipients and nominees | Result |
|---|---|---|---|
| Tony Awards | Best Actress in a Leading Role – Play | Anne Bancroft | Won |
| Tony Awards | Best Direction – Play | Arthur Penn | Won |
| Tony Awards | Best Play | | Won |
| Tony Awards | Best Producer - Play | Fred Coe | Won |
| Tony Awards | Best Scenic Design - Play | George Jenkins | Nominated |
| Tony Awards | Best Stage Technician | John Walters | Won |
| Tony Awards | Theatre World Award | Patty Duke | Won |

== Film (1962) ==
=== Organizations ===
| Organization | Category | Recipients and nominees | Result |
|---|---|---|---|
| Academy Awards | Best Director | Arthur Penn | Nominated |
| Academy Awards | Best Actress in a Leading Role | Anne Bancroft | Won |
| Academy Awards | Best Actress in a Supporting Role | Patty Duke | Won |
| Academy Awards | Best Screenplay – Adapted | William Gibson | Nominated |
| Academy Awards | Best Costume Design – Black-and-White | Ruth Morley | Nominated |
| BAFTA Awards | Best Film from any Source | | Nominated |
| BAFTA Awards | Best Foreign Actress in a Leading Role | Anne Bancroft | Won |
| Golden Globe Awards | Best Actress in a Leading Role – Drama | Anne Bancroft | Nominated |
| Golden Globe Awards | Best Actress in a Supporting Role | Patty Duke | Nominated |
| Golden Globe Awards | Best Film – Drama | | Nominated |

=== Guilds ===
| Guild | Category | Recipients and nominees | Result |
|---|---|---|---|
| Belgian Film Critics Association | Grand Prix | Arthur Penn | Won |
| Directors Guild of America | Outstanding Directing | Arthur Penn | Nominated |
| Writers Guild of America | Best Written American Drama | William Gibson | Nominated |

=== Film festivals ===
| Festival | Category | Recipients and nominees | Result |
|---|---|---|---|
| San Sebastián Film Festival | Prize San Sebastián: Best Actress | Anne Bancroft | Won |
| San Sebastián Film Festival | OCIC Award | Arthur Penn | Won |

== Television film (1979) ==
=== Organizations ===
| Organization | Category | Recipients and nominees | Result |
|---|---|---|---|
| Emmy Awards | Outstanding Actress in a Leading Role – Limited Series or Special | Patty Duke | Won |
| Emmy Awards | Outstanding Actress in a Leading Role – Limited Series or Special | Melissa Gilbert | Nominated |
| Emmy Awards | Outstanding Cinematography – Limited Series or Special | Ted Voigtlander | Nominated |
| Emmy Awards | Outstanding Hairstyling | Larry Germain and Donna Barrett Gilbert | Won |
| Emmy Awards | Outstanding Special – Comedy or Drama | | Won |
| Golden Globe Awards | Best Film Made for Television | | Nominated |

=== Guilds ===
| Organization | Category | Recipients and nominees | Result |
|---|---|---|---|
| American Cinema Editors | Best Editing – Television Special | Gerald Lee Taylor | Nominated |
| Directors Guild of America | Outstanding Directing – Special/Television Film/Actuality | Paul Aaron | Nominated |

== Television film (2000) ==
=== Organizations ===
| Organization | Category | Recipients and nominees | Result |
|---|---|---|---|
| Young Artist Awards | Best Young Actress (age ten or under) – Television Film | Hallie Kate Eisenberg | Nominated |

=== Guilds ===
| Organization | Category | Recipients and nominees | Result |
|---|---|---|---|
| Motion Picture Sound Editors | Best Sound Editing, Television Film and Specials – Dialogue & ADR | John Benson, John Green and Sonya Henry | Nominated |
