= Freud (TV serial) =

- Written by: Carey Harrison
- Directed by: Moira Armstrong
- Starring: David Suchet; Helen Bourne; Michael Pennington
- Music by: Ilona Sekacz
- Country of origin: United Kingdom
- Original language: English

Production
- Producer: John Purdie
- Running time: 360 minutes

Original release
- Release: 14 September 1984

Freud, also known as Freud: the Life of a Dream, is a 1984 BBC television serial based on the life and times of Austrian psychoanalyst Sigmund Freud. David Suchet stars as Freud. The 6-part production is 360 minutes in duration.

== Episodes ==
Each episode begins with Freud and his family in London, where they had fled from Vienna in 1938 following the Nazi Anschluss, leading up to Freud's death a little over a year later in 1939. The rest of each episode is told mainly in flashbacks to key moments in Freud's life and career.

1. "In the Name of the Gods": Ailing Sigmund Freud, his wife Martha, and daughter Anna settle into a new home in London after being forced to flee Austria. Flashbacks recall Freud's early professional life, ambitions to do important work, and engagement to Martha, whose sister Minna is also engaged. Freud experiments with cocaine as a cure for morphine addiction and other uses, prompted especially by his relationship with Ernst von Fleischl-Marxow.
2. "The Hypnotist": Freud goes to Paris to study with Jean-Marin Charcot, who has been experimenting with hypnosis to treat patients with "hysterical" neuroses. Returning to Vienna, his advocacy of Charcot's techniques is largely rejected, especially by his superior, Theodor Meynert. With the aid of Josef Breuer he begins to use hypnosis to treat patients, in particular the (fictional) Baroness von Lieben. His work leads him to begin investigating the role of dreams and repression of memories.
3. "The Secret of Dreams": Through his practice, self-examination, and friendships with Wilhelm Fliess and Breuer, Freud develops his concepts of the unconscious and the role of desire, beginning to posit sexuality as a source of psychic conflict and to develop his "seduction theory."
4. "Madonna": When Freud's concept of child sexuality and the seduction theory are rejected by his colleagues, including Breuer, he finds himself isolated. As Martha tends to the home and their growing family, Freud engages more with Martha's sister Minna, whose own fiancé had died. At first rejecting his brother Alexander's suggestion that he travel to Italy and Rome, mainly because of the Catholic Church's history of Jewish persecution, Freud relents. Traveling with Alexander and later with Minna, his observations of the many images of the Madonna and child and memories of incidents from his own childhood lead him to propose the concept of the Oedipus complex and abandon the seduction theory.
5. "Messiah": Isolated in Viennese society, Freud draws the attention of other young psychoanalysts, who come to form an inner circle studying and arguing about the unconscious and the role of psychoanalysis. When Freud is contacted by Swiss psychoanalyst Carl Jung, Freud enthusiastically welcomes him and suggests that Jung will take over leadership of the group, especially since a gentile would be more acceptable to European society than one of the other Jewish members. Freud's own fame leads to an invitation to appear at Clark University in the United States. During the voyage and after, divisions between Freud and Jung deepen. In talks with Minna and others, Freud begins to suggest that psychoanalysis is better regarded as a philosophy than as a science as such.
6. "The World as Dream": The episode alternates between flashbacks to earlier scenes and the dying Freud in London, now increasingly in pain from cancer and from the prosthetic jaw he wears due to an earlier operation. Scenes recount moments with von Fleischel-Marxow, Fliess, Breuer, Meynert, Martha and Minna, and others leading to the final split with Jung and the last moments in Vienna before leaving. At the end, Freud's doctor fulfills a promise to administer a dose of morphine that will end his pain and his life.

== Cast (in alphabetical order) ==
- Suzanne Bertish ... Minna Bernays
- Peter Birrel ... Alfred Adler
- Helen Bourne ... Martha Bernays
- Raymond Brody ... Klemperor
- Jack Chissick ... Oppenheim
- Jeremy Clyne ... Wolfman
- Claire Davenport ... Teresa
- Howard Goorney ... Jacob Freud
- David Hatton ... Stekel
- Eliza Hunt ... Amalie Freud
- Peter Jeffrey ... Federn
- Alison Key ... Anna Freud
- Michael Kitchen ... Ernst Von Fleischel-Marxow
- Dinsdale Landen ... Jean-Martin Charcot
- Martin Lawton ... Meissi
- Anton Lesser ... Wilhelm Fliess
- Leon Lissek ... Fritz Wittels
- Miriam Margolyes ... Baroness
- Clive Merrison ... Tausk
- Michael Pennington ... Carl Jung
- Kerry Shale ... Rank
- Colette Stevenson ... Dancer
- Juliet Stevenson ... Elizabeth von Reitberg
- David Suchet ... Dr. Sigmund Freud
- David Swift ... Josef Breuer
- Hugh Thomas ... Ferenczi
