= 15th Writers Guild of America Awards =

- Date: May 7, 1963
- Site: Beverly Hilton Hotel, Los Angeles, California, U.S.
- Organized by: Writers Guild of America, East and the Writers Guild of America, West

The 15th Writers Guild of America Awards honored the best film writers and television writers of 1962. Winners were announced in 1963.

== Winners and nominees ==
=== Film ===
Winners are listed first highlighted in boldface.

**Best Written Musical**: **The Music Man, Screenplay by Marion Hargrove; Based on the musical by Meredith Willson**; Billy Rose's Jumbo, Screenplay by Sidney Sheldon; Based on the musical by Ben Hecht and Charles MacArthur; Gypsy, Screenplay by Leonard Spigelgass; Based on the memoir of Gypsy Rose Lee; Hey, Let's Twist, Written by Hal Hackady; State Fair, Screenplay by Richard L. Breen; Based on the novel by Philip Stong	**Best Written American Drama**: **To Kill a Mockingbird, Screenplay by Horton Foote; Based on the novel by Harper Lee**; Billy Budd, Screenplay by Peter Ustinov and DeWitt Bodeen; Based on the novel by Herman Melville, and the play by Louis O. Coxe and Robert H. Chapman; Birdman of Alcatraz, Screenplay by Guy Trosper; Based on the book by Thomas E. Gaddis; Freud, Screenplay by Charles Kaufman and Wolfgang Reinhardt; Story by Charles Kaufman; The Miracle Worker, Screenplay by William Gibson; Based on his play
**Best Written American Comedy**: **That Touch of Mink, Written by Nate Monaster and Stanley Shapiro**; Mr. Hobbs Takes a Vacation, Screenplay by Nunnally Johnson; Based on the novel "Mr. Hobbs' Vacation" by Edward Streeter; The Notorious Landlady, Screenplay by Blake Edwards and Larry Gelbart; Based on the story "The Notorious Tenant" by Margery Sharp; Period of Adjustment, Screenplay by Isobel Lennart; Based on the play by Tennessee Williams; The Pigeon That Took Rome, Screenplay by Melville Shavelson; Based on the novel by Donald Downes	

=== Television ===
**Episodic Drama**: **"Today the Man Who Kills Ants Is Coming" – Naked City (ABC) – Kenneth M. Rosen and Howard Rodman**; "I Remember a Lemon Tree" – Ben Casey (ABC) - Jack Laird and Marcus Demian; "The Multiplicity of Herbert Konish" – Naked City (ABC) – Ernest Kinoy; "Goodnight Sweet Blues" – Route 66 (CBS) – Will Lorin and Leonard Freeman; "The Benefactor" – The Defenders (CBS) – Peter Stone	**Anthology, Any Length**: **"Price of Tomatoes" – The Dick Powell Theatre (NBC) – Richard Alan Simmons**; "The Jail" – Alcoa Premiere (ABC) – Ray Bradbury and Tad Mosel; "People Need People" – Alcoa Premier (ABC) – Henry F. Greenberg; "Death in a Village" – The Dick Powell Theatre (NBC) – Christopher Knopf and Aaron Spelling; "The Remarkable Mrs. Hawk" – Thriller (NBC) – Donald S. Sanford; Westinghouse Presents: That's Where the Town Is Going (CBS) – Tad Mosel
**Comedy/Variety, Any Length**: **"I Won't Go" – Car 54, Where Are You? (NBC) – Nat Hiken and Gary Belkin**; "Birds and Bees" – My Three Sons (ABC) – George Tibbles; "Where Did I Come From?" – The Dick Van Dyke Show (CBS) – Carl Reiner

=== Special awards ===
Laurel Award for Screenwriting Achievement

**Joseph L. Mankiewicz**

Valentine Davies Award

**Allen Rivkin**
