= Freude =

Freude (German: "joy") may refer to:

== People ==
- Rodolfo Freude (1922–2003) advisor to Argentine President Juan Perón

== Culture ==
- Die Freude reget sich, BWV 36b, 1735 cantata by Johann Sebastian Bach
- Freude Freude über Freude, a 1744 work; see List of cantatas by Christoph Graupner
- Freude, second hour piece for two harps in the 2005 cycle Klang (Stockhausen) by Karlheinz Stockhausen

== See also ==
- An die Freude; see Ode to Joy
- Jesu, meine Freude, hymn
- Jesu, meine Freude, BWV 227, 1723 motet by Johann Sebastian Bach
- Kraft durch Freude; see Strength Through Joy
- Freud (disambiguation)
