= Freud: The Secret Passion =

1962 film directed by John Huston

- Theatrical poster
- Directed by: John Huston
- Screenplay by: Charles Kaufman; Wolfgang Reinhardt
- Story by: Charles Kaufman; Jean-Paul Sartre (Note: Uncredited.)
- Produced by: Wolfgang Reinhardt
- Starring: Montgomery Clift; Susannah York; Larry Parks; Susan Kohner; Eileen Herlie; Eric Portman
- Cinematography: Douglas Slocombe
- Edited by: Ralph Kemplen
- Music by: Jerry Goldsmith; Henk Badings
- Production company: Universal-International
- Distributed by: Universal-International
- Release date: December 12, 1962
- Running time: 140 minutes
- Country: United States
- Language: English

Freud: The Secret Passion, or simply Freud, is a 1962 American biographical drama film directed by John Huston and produced by Wolfgang Reinhardt. Based on the life of Austrian neurologist Sigmund Freud, it stars Montgomery Clift as Freud and Susannah York as his patient Cecily Koertner. Other cast members include Larry Parks, Susan Kohner, Eileen Herlie, Eric Portman, and David McCallum. The screenplay was by Charles Kaufman and Reinhardt, with some elements from a script by Jean-Paul Sartre, who withdrew his name from the film.

The film was theatrically released in the United States by Universal-International on December 12, 1962, and was selected to compete for the Golden Bear in the competition section at the 13th Berlin International Film Festival. It was nominated for two Academy Awards and four Golden Globe Awards, including Best Motion Picture – Drama and Best Actress in a Motion Picture – Drama for York.

== Plot ==
The film begins with a voice-over narration by director John Huston, describing the story as Sigmund Freud's "descent into a region almost as black as hell itself--man's unconscious--and how he let in the light." Huston's voice-overs also occur at the film's ending and substitute for Freud's thoughts in some scenes,

In 1885 Vienna, young doctor Sigmund Freud has completed his medical training and finds himself at odds with hospital head Theodore Meynert, especially regarding the status of "hysteria" as a psychological disorder. With his mother Amalia's encouragement, Freud goes to Paris to study the condition with Dr. Jean-Marin Charcot, who has made some advances with the help of hypnosis but still has not been able to fully cure his patients.

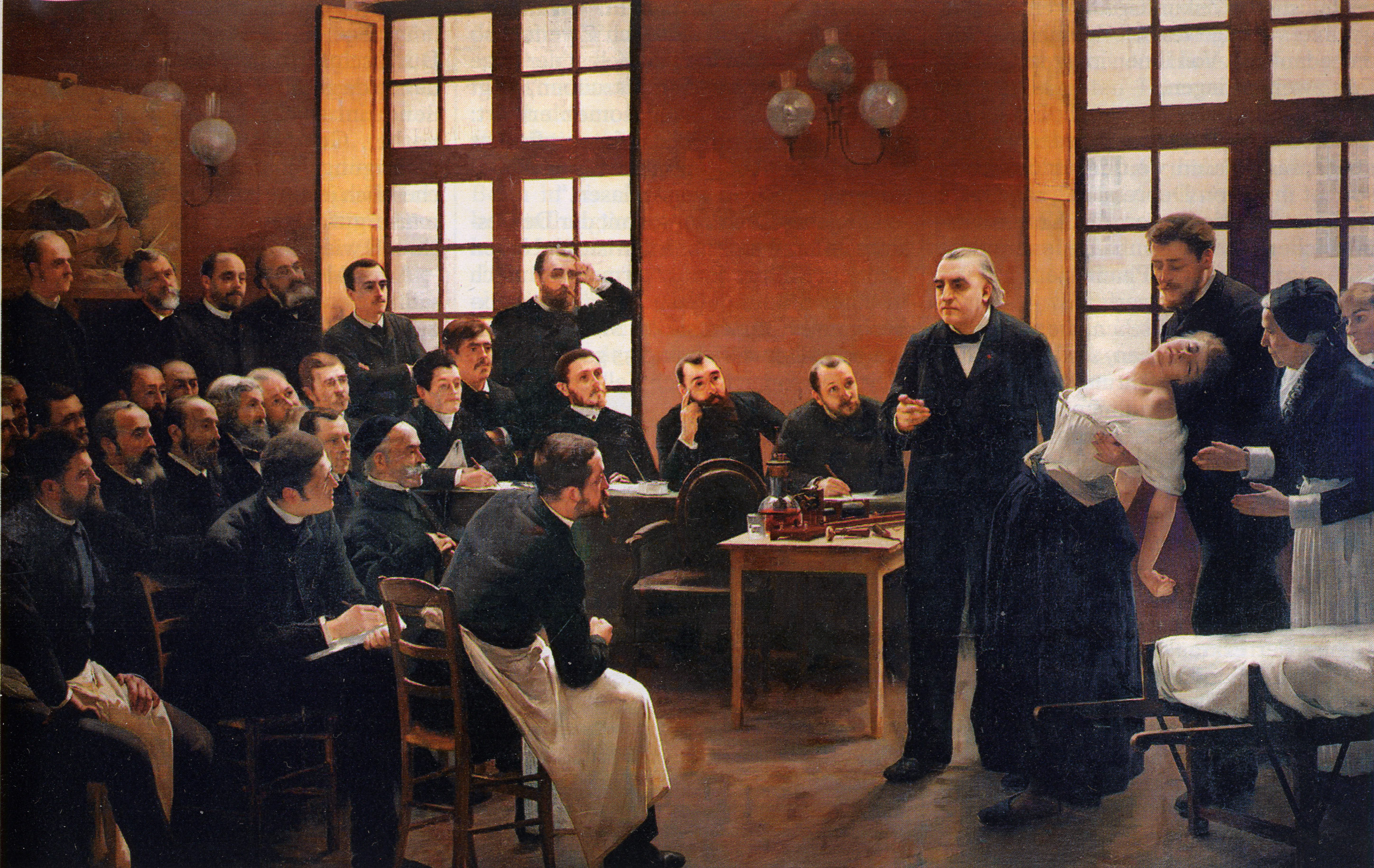
Early in the film, Freud spends time in Paris learning from Dr. Jean-Marin Charcot. The scene recreates the painting "A Clinical Lesson at the Salpêtrière" by Pierre Aristide André Brouillet.

Returning to Vienna, Freud marries Martha Bernays and sets up practice, trying Charcot's techniques to cure different patients of their neuroses. He is especially upset and driven to unsettling dreams, however, when one patient, Carl von Schlosser, stabs his soldier father's uniform and fondles the female mannequin beneath it. Although tempted to live a more routine life as a doctor, Freud partners with another doctor, Josef Breuer, who has made some progress by getting his patients to talk about their conditions while under hypnosis.

Together, Breuer and Freud treat Cecily Koertner (a fictional character based in part on Freud's patient "Anna O"). When it becomes apparent that Cecily is sexually attracted to Breuer, he leaves her treatment to Freud, who eventually foregoes hypnotism and has her recount her dreams and to free-associate words, memories, and ideas. Cecily's attachment to Breuer transfers to Freud, but despite Martha's concerns he presses on through different layers of Cecily's unconscious. Freud also begins to examine his own neuroses and dreams, leading him to the concepts of child sexuality and the Oedipus complex, concepts that Breuer is unable to accept.

At a lecture to other doctors and psychologists, Freud's ideas are received with derision, but a few people defend his willingness to break out of old habits and prejudices in search of the truth. Huston's narration closes with the "words carved on the temple at Delphi: Know thyself. . . . This knowledge is now within our grasp. Will we use it? Let us hope."

== Cast ==
- Montgomery Clift as Sigmund Freud
- Susannah York as Cecily Koertner
- Larry Parks as Dr. Josef Breuer
- Susan Kohner as Martha Freud
- Eileen Herlie as Ida Koertner
- Fernand Ledoux as Dr. Jean-Martin Charcot
- David McCallum as Carl von Schlosser
- Rosalie Crutchley as Amalia Freud
- David Kossoff as Jacob Freud
- Joseph Fürst as Jacob Koertner
- Alexander Mango as Babinsky
- Leonard Sachs as Brouhardier
- Eric Portman as Dr. Theodore Meynert
- Victor Beaumont as Dr. Guber
- Allan Cuthbertson as Wilkie
- Maria Perschy as Magda
- Moira Redmond as Nora Wimmer
- John Huston as Narrator (voice)

== Production ==
Montgomery Clift and Susannah York in Freud

=== Writing ===
In 1958, John Huston decided to make a film about the life of the young Sigmund Freud, and asked Jean-Paul Sartre to write a summary of a projected scenario. Sartre submitted a synopsis of 95 pages, which was accepted, but later completed a finished script that, if filmed, would have amounted to a running time of five hours, which Huston considered far too long. Huston suggested cuts, but Sartre submitted an even longer script of eight hours, justifying the even longer version by saying, "On peut faire un film de quatre heures s'il s'agit de Ben Hur, mais le public de Texas ne supporterait pas quatre heures de complexes" ("We can make a film of four hours in the case of Ben Hur, but the Texas public couldn't stand four hours of complexes."). Huston and Sartre quarreled, and Sartre withdrew his name from the film's credits. Nevertheless, many key elements from Sartre's script survive in the finished film, such as the creation of the composite patient Cecily Koertner, who combines features of Freud's patients Anna O., Elisabeth von R., Dora, and others. After Sartre's death, his screenplay was published separately as The Freud Scenario.

=== Casting ===
Sartre and Huston were both interested in casting Marilyn Monroe as Cecily, but she turned down the offer and Susannah York was cast instead. Huston cast Larry Parks as Josef Breuer in part to redeem Parks' career after being blacklisted, but this proved to be the actor's last film. Huston had previously worked with Montgomery Clift (and Monroe) on The Misfits (1961), but found himself uncomfortable with Clift's drug and alcohol problems, exacerbated by vision problems due to cataracts, and by his homosexuality. Freud proved to be Clift's next-to-last film performance.

=== Filming and post-production ===
Filming took place over five months in Munich and Vienna and cost approximately four million dollars, twice the original budget. To satisfy the Production Code Authority, Huston cut the film's original length of over three hours to two hours and fifty minutes, but the studio cut an additional half-hour before the film was released.

== Historical accuracy ==
The film heavily compresses events, cases and acquaintances early in Freud's career, spanning from his work at the Vienna General Hospital under Theodor Meynert (Eric Portman) during the mid-1880s, through his research into hysteria and his seduction theory along with Breuer, up until his development of infantile sexuality and the Oedipus complex around the turn of the century that became the basis for his fundamental Three Essays on the Theory of Sexuality, first published in 1905.

The character of Cecily Koertner is based upon a number of early patients of Freud's, most heavily drawing on the Anna O. case but also Dora and others. Similarly, the character of Josef Breuer and his role as mentor and friend in Freud's life as portrayed by Larry Parks is in fact a combination of the real Breuer with Wilhelm Fliess.

== Reception ==
=== Box office ===
Although Freud received a share of positive reviews and award nominations, it earned only $2.9 million, well below its production cost.

=== Critical response ===
==== Contemporary reviews ====
Just prior to the film's U.S. premiere, Huston wrote a column for The New York Times describing his intentions in making Freud. Times film critic Bosley Crowther selected the film as one of the ten best of 1962, describing it as "stark, intense and penetrating" and Clift's performance as "eerily illuminating." Other reviews were mixed, with Time magazine praising the film, but Newsweek dismissing it. Critic John Simon described it as "respectful and, Lord knows, serious," while the journal Films and Filming called it a "period piece," Film scholar Ernest Callenbach described it as "a feature-length classroom film." Nonetheless, the film received two Academy Award nominations (for Best Original Screenplay and Best Music) and four Golden Globe nominations (for Best Motion Picture, Actress, Supporting Actress, and Director). Huston was nominated for the Golden Bear award at the 1963 Berlin Film Festival and by the Directors Guild of America. The Writers Guild of America also nominated Charles Kaufman and Wolfgang Reinhardt for their screenplay.

Élisabeth Roudinesco comments that Freud: The Secret Passion "did not have any success. And yet the black and white photography of Douglas Slocombe recaptures superbly the baroque universe of fin de siècle Vienna. As for Montgomery Clift, he portrays an anguished, somber and fragile Freud, closer to the James Dean of Rebel Without a Cause than to the mummified figure imposed by the official historians of psychoanalysis: a character, in any event, more Sartrean than Jonesian. The work was distributed to the movie houses of Paris at the beginning of June 1964, two weeks before Lacan's foundation of the Ėcole Freudienne de Paris. It went completely unnoticed by the psychoanalysts of Paris, who failed to find in it the hero of their imagination." Sartre did not see the film.

==== Other assessments ====
... it's a fascinating attempt to mix a traditional biopic with more experimental elements, such as rather surreal dreams sequences.
As director John Huston's voiceover suggests, it's a film that's less interested in Freud himself than the possibilities of unlocking the human mind and how that can be shown on screen – how can you portray the ideas of psychology on screen? As a result it plays fast and loose with history in favour of trying to uncover what Freud's ideas mean. It is an interesting and entertaining movie, with a great central performance from Montgomery Clift.

— Tim Isaac (Big Gay Picture Show), Freud (DVD)

... a curiously involving biopic about that which interests us all – ourselves and what ails us. ... Freud is a strong and sombre drama about life's psychological traumas and the first man who attempted to quantify and cure them. It's a well-acted and very solid movie but stay well clear if you fancy a bit of diverting amusement. Both Freud and A Dangerous Method deal with the fact that movies about people talking are not exactly visually exciting but Huston (and Cronenberg) pull off the drama within the subject in their own very different and intriguing ways.

— Cineoutsider, Alien landscapes – A UK region 2 DVD review of FREUD

A sincere and competent biopic on the early years of Dr. Sigmund Freud (Montgomery Clift) ... Clift makes for a brooding and introspective Freud, obsessed with proving his controversial theories correct. Huston films it as film noir, with Freud the detective. What makes Huston's black-and-white film remarkable is the dream sequences, which are photographed mostly in negative or overexposure. This mise en scéne gave it a tantalizing German expressionist look and made the patient's repressions come to life on the screen, telling more about the subject matter than the narrative's wearisome simplistic didactic tone.

— Dennis Schwartz's Movie Reviews, FREUD (aka: Freud: The Secret Passion)

Montgomery Clift delivers a superb, yet troubled and complex interpretation that benefits from remarkable direction. Probably too risky for its day, the film was a surprise sleeper hit: theatres in the mid-west had to ditch scheduled features when audience demand quadrupled.. such was the morbidity of the times. An overlooked gem even to this day, this is an unfortunate loss since Freud: The Secret Passion is a remarkable film.

— Le Monde, Freud, passions secrètes (1962) de John Huston

Huston's problem was to render an intellectual quest, one that wants to be told in words, in images suited to film. He chose a metaphorical structure that runs all through our literature, from the Odyssey to Star Trek: THE MIND IS A BODY MOVING THROUGH SPACE. ... The substitution of face for body, body for mind, movement through space for movement in thought – there is a pattern of substitutions running throughout Freud. ... My point about Freud, the movie, then, is finally that it is a tremendous success – if you look straight at it. I think that it is not only an extraordinarily good film as a visual experience, as acting, as structure, but it also embodies a highly personal vision of psychoanalysis and its founder. My vision of Huston's vision in Freud is that psychoanalysis reveals human life as an endless series of displacements from what we really and originally desire and seek. It is a vision that profoundly expresses Huston's own "as if" view of life. Huston is indeed an auteur, a genius, at least by his own definition. He enables you and me to see Freud and psychoanalysis in a strikingly new, but highly intelligent way."

— Norman N. Holland (A Sharper Focus), John Huston, Freud, 1962

=== Accolades ===
Year	Ceremony	Category	Nominee(s)	Result
1963	15th Directors Guild of America Awards	Outstanding Directorial Achievement in Motion Pictures	John Huston	Nominated
1963	20th Golden Globe Awards	Best Film – Drama		Nominated
1963	20th Golden Globe Awards	Best Actress – Drama	Susannah York	Nominated
1963	20th Golden Globe Awards	Best Supporting Actress	Susan Kohner	Nominated
1963	20th Golden Globe Awards	Best Director	John Huston	Nominated
1963	35th Academy Awards	Best Story and Screenplay Written Directly for the Screen	Charles Kaufman, Wolfgang Reinhardt	Nominated
1963	35th Academy Awards	Best Music Score – Substantially Original	Jerry Goldsmith	Nominated
1963	15th Writers Guild of America Awards	Best Written American Drama	Charles Kaufman, Wolfgang Reinhardt	Nominated

== Soundtrack ==
The mostly dissonant, atonal score to Freud was one of the early works by composer Jerry Goldsmith with an electronic music sequence by Henk Badings. It garnered Goldsmith his first Oscar nomination. The "Main Title" from Freud, as well as the tracks "Charcot's Show", "Desperate Case", and "The First Step" later were purchased and reused without consent of Goldsmith by director Ridley Scott for the acid blood scene and other sequences in the film Alien (1979), also scored by Goldsmith.

== Home media ==
Having previously been unavailable in a home media format, Freud: The Secret Passion was eventually released in the UK by Transition Digital Media in a 1.78:1 letter-boxed, non-anamorphic 4:3 format, on a Region 2 DVD edition on April 23, 2012. In the U.S., Kino Lorber Studio Classics released a new 2K transfer on standard DVD and Blu-ray on November 30, 2021.

== See also ==
- List of American films of 1962
