= Zelda (film) =

1993 American television film

- Genre: Biographical drama
- Written by: Anthony Ivor; Benedict Fitzgerald
- Directed by: Pat O'Connor
- Starring: Natasha Richardson; Timothy Hutton
- Music by: Patrick Williams
- Country of origin: United States
- Original language: English

Production
- Executive producer: Robert Greenwald
- Producer: Steven P. Saeta
- Production location: Montreal
- Cinematography: Kenneth MacMillan
- Editor: Michael Bradsell
- Running time: 91 minutes
- Production company: Turner Pictures

Original release
- Network: TNT
- Release: November 7, 1993

Zelda is a 1993 American biographical drama television film directed by Pat O'Connor and written by Anthony Ivor and Benedict Fitzgerald, about the lives of author F. Scott Fitzgerald and his wife Zelda Fitzgerald, artist and fellow author. It stars Natasha Richardson as Zelda and Timothy Hutton as Scott. It aired on TNT on November 7, 1993.

== Cast ==
- Natasha Richardson as Zelda Fitzgerald
- Timothy Hutton as Francis Scott Fitzgerald
- Rutanya Alda
- Sylvie Boucher as Lounge singer
- Catherine Colvey as Sara Murphy
- Marie-Josée Croze as Nanny
- Daniel Gerroll as Maxwell Perkins
- Spalding Gray as Sayre
- Arthur Holden as Man on train
- Robert Knepper as Wilson
- Viveca Lindfors as Madame
- Holt McCallany
- Paul McCrane

== Critical reception ==
Robert Goldberg of the Wall Street Journal praised Natasha Richardson's performance but felt that the film left out too many details of Zelda Fitzgerald's life.
