= Model Wife =

1941 film directed by Leigh Jason

- Theatrical release poster
- Directed by: Leigh Jason
- Screenplay by: Charles Kaufman; Horace Jackson; Grant Garett
- Story by: Leigh Jason
- Produced by: Leigh Jason
- Starring: Joan Blondell; Dick Powell; Charlie Ruggles; Lee Bowman; Lucile Watson; Ruth Donnelly; Billy Gilbert
- Cinematography: Norbert Brodine
- Edited by: Arthur Hilton
- Production company: Universal Pictures
- Distributed by: Universal Pictures
- Release date: April 18, 1941
- Running time: 78 minutes
- Country: United States
- Language: English

Model Wife is a 1941 American comedy film directed by Leigh Jason and written by Charles Kaufman, Horace Jackson and Grant Garett. The film stars Joan Blondell, Dick Powell, Charlie Ruggles, Lee Bowman, Lucile Watson, Ruth Donnelly and Billy Gilbert. The film was released on April 18, 1941, by Universal Pictures.

== Synopsis ==
Joan and Fred Chambers are a married couple, struggling financially, who both work at Bensons department store. Company policy forbids the employment of married people and so they both pretend to be single. Things take a complicated turn when the wastrel son of the owner gets Joan as his secretary and decides she would make the perfect wife for him.

== Cast ==
- Joan Blondell as Joan Keating Chambers
- Dick Powell as Fred Chambers
- Charlie Ruggles as Milo Everett
- Lee Bowman as Ralph Benson
- Lucile Watson as J.J. Benson
- Ruth Donnelly as Mrs. Milo Everett
- Billy Gilbert as Dominic
- John Qualen as The Janitor
- Lorraine Krueger as Jitterbug
- Glen Turnbull as Jitterbug

== Bibliography ==
- Fetrow, Alan G. Feature Films, 1940-1949: a United States Filmography. McFarland, 1994.
