= Wise Blood (film) =

1979 film directed by John Huston

- Original film poster
- Directed by: John Huston
- Screenplay by: Benedict Fitzgerald; Michael Fitzgerald
- Based on: Wise Blood (1952 novel) by Flannery O'Connor
- Produced by: Kathy Fitzgerald; Michael Fitzgerald
- Starring: Brad Dourif; Ned Beatty; Harry Dean Stanton; Dan Shor; Amy Wright; Mary Nell Santacroce
- Cinematography: Gerry Fisher
- Edited by: Roberto Silvi
- Music by: Alex North
- Production company: Ithaca Productions; Athena Film GmBH
- Distributed by: New Line Cinema (US)
- Release dates: May 23, 1979 (Cannes); December 12, 1979 (Los Angeles)
- Running time: 108 minutes
- Countries: United States; West Germany
- Language: English
- Budget: $2,000,000

Wise Blood is a 1979 Southern Gothic black comedy-drama film directed by John Huston and written by Benedict Fitzgerald and Michael Fitzgerald, based on Flannery O'Connor's 1952 novel. It stars Brad Dourif, Ned Beatty, Harry Dean Stanton, Dan Shor, Amy Wright and Mary Nell Santacroce. The film follows the lives of war veteran preacher Hazel "Haze" Motes (Dourif) who preaches an atheistic "Church of Truth Without Christ."

The film premiered at the 1979 Cannes Film Festival, where it received a mixed reception. The film has since been reevaluated as one of Huston’s best films and a masterful adaptation of O’Connor’s writing.

== Plot ==
Hazel "Haze" Motes is a 22-year-old veteran of an unspecified war and a preacher of the Church of Truth Without Christ, a religious organization of his own creation, which is against any belief in God, an afterlife, sin, or evil. Hazel comes across various characters such as teenager Sabbath Lilly Hawks, who is madly in love with him; her father Asa Hawks who is a conventional sidewalk preacher, and pretends to be blind; and a local boy, Enoch Emery, who finds a "new" Jesus at the local museum in the form of the tiny corpse of a shrunken South American Indian.

Hazel's relationship with Sabbath Lilly goes sour when she takes the tiny corpse that Enoch gave her to pass on to Hazel, and she poses with it in a Madonna and Child manner. Hazel throws the corpse against the wall, and its head out the window. Sabbath Lilly becomes very angry and berates Hazel. Hoover Shoates is a promoter who wants to manage Hazel's career as a prophet. However, Hazel is not enthusiastic, so Shoates finds someone to dress like Hazel and preach in a somewhat similar way. Hazel finds this out, is enraged, and eventually pursues the man out of town and runs him over with his car.

Meanwhile, Enoch is fascinated with a local show involving a man in a gorilla suit; Enoch sneaks into the promoters' truck, steals the suit, and wanders around town terrorizing people while wearing the suit. A sheriff stops Hazel on the road and sends Hazel's car rolling into a lake. After this, Hazel deliberately blinds himself with quicklime, a counterpoint to Asa's fake-blinding himself. Hazel's landlady must take care of him, and falls in love with him. However, she is shocked to find he has wound barbed wire around his torso, and has rocks in his shoes.

After her proposal of marriage is spurned by Hazel, and he leaves, the landlady calls the police and reports him as derelict in paying rent. The police find Hazel lying in rubbish in a semi-conscious state. They return him to the house where he is placed on a bed in the landlady's custody. She promises him an easy life, in any part of the house he chooses, with her waiting on him full time. The film ends with the landlady's failed attempts to get a response from the now-completely unresponsive Hazel, who may be dead.

== Cast ==
- Brad Dourif as Hazel "Haze" Motes
- Ned Beatty as Hoover Shoates
- Harry Dean Stanton as Asa Hawks
- Dan Shor as Enoch Emory
- Amy Wright as Sabbath Lily Hawks
- Mary Nell Santacroce as Landlady
- John Huston as Grandfather
- William Hickey as Preacher
- J.L. Parker as Karl
- Marvin Sapp as Raymond
- Richard Earle as Jakob Winslow
- Herb Kossover as Jacob Wood
- Betty Lou Groover as Leora Watts
- John Tyndall as Loki Martinson
- Stratton Leopold as Depressed Human
- Ray Wilkes as Sheriff

== Production ==
=== Development ===
The film was written and produced by siblings and first-time filmmakers Michael and Benedict Fitzgerald. The Fitzgeralds had close ties to the source novel's writer Flannery O'Connor as their father Robert Fitzgerald had been O'Connor's literary executor and the brothers had been babysat by her as children. Aside from Michael and Benedict, other members of the Fitzgerald family were involved in the production in various capacities. Michael's wife Kathy Fitzgerald was a producer, and O'Connor's longtime friend and editor Sally Fitzgerald was the set decorator and costume designer. Prior to John Huston's involvement, Cliff Robertson was in talks to direct an adaptation. Financing for the film came primarily from West German company Athena Films.

=== Casting ===
Huston's original choice to play Haze Motes was Tommy Lee Jones, with Brad Dourif offered the role of Enoch Emory. However, Dourif was only interested in playing Haze. When Jones proved unavailable due to a scheduling issue, Huston allowed Dourif to audition for Haze, then cast him on the spot. Huston himself appears in two fantasy sequences as Hazel's fanatical preacher grandfather.

=== Filming ===
Wise Blood was filmed mostly in and around Macon, Georgia, near O'Connor's home Andalusia in Baldwin County, using many local residents as extras and supporting players. The then-Bibb County sheriff Ray Wilkes appears in the film as the police officer that destroys Haze's car. A shrunken head from Mercer University was used in the production and appears in the final film. The head was repatriated by the university in 2019. Huston completed his autobiography, An Open Book, during the making of this film.

=== Opening titles ===
The opening titles were designed by a child, for a deliberately offbeat and surreal effect. This resulted in several misspellings, including listing Huston's name as "Jhon Huston."

== Release ==
The film premiered out of competition at the 1979 Cannes Film Festival in May 1979. New Line Cinema picked up U.S. distribution of the film thereafter.

The film was amended—in particular, the soundtrack—and was shown at the New York Film Festival in September and then released in France in October. The film was released for an Academy Awards qualifying run for one week at the Laemmle Royal Theatre in Los Angeles in December before being released in the rest of the United States in February 1980.

=== Home media ===
It was released on DVD by the Criterion Collection on May 12, 2009.

== Reception ==
At Cannes, the film received a mixed reception. Following its screening at the New York Film Festival, The New York Times critic Vincent Canby called the film "one of John Huston's most original, most stunning movies. It is so eccentric, so funny, so surprising, and so haunting that it is difficult to believe it is not the first film of some enfant terrible instead of the thirty-third feature by a man who is now in his seventies and whose career has had more highs and lows than a decade of weather maps." Sam Jordison of The Guardian wrote in a retrospective review, "This adaptation is wonderful. It pulls off the rare trick of seeming faithful to the spirit and voice of the book, while being a work of art in its own right."

Marjorie Baumgarten from The Austin Chronicle wrote, "Disturbing and grim in its portraits, Wise Blood is nevertheless marvelous storytelling and its performances are virtually divine." Time Out described the film as "Tragically, desperately funny" and called it "John Huston's best film for many years".

On review aggregator website Rotten Tomatoes, Wise Blood holds a score of 89% based on 27 critic reviews. The site's critical consensus reads, "Director John Huston and author Flannery O'Connor prove a formidable creative match in Wise Blood, a gothic satire anchored by Brad Dourif's vinegary performance." On Metacritic, the film has a weighted average score of 84 out of 100 based on 16 critic reviews, indicating "critical acclaim".

In 2003, The New York Times placed the film on its Best 1000 Movies Ever list.

=== Awards and nominations ===
Institution	Year	Category	Nominee	Result
Chicago International Film Festival	1979	Gold Hugo	John Huston	Nominated
New York Film Critics Circle	1980	Best Film		4th place
New York Film Critics Circle	1980	Best Supporting Actress	Mary Nell Santacroce	Nominated
San Sebastián International Film Festival	1979	Golden Shell	John Huston	Nominated
San Sebastián International Film Festival	1979	Best Actor	Brad Dourif	Nominated

== See also ==
- John Huston filmography
