= David Haggart =

The Life and adventures of David Haggart

David Haggart (24 June 1801 – 18 July 1821) was a Scottish thief and rogue.

== Early life ==
Haggart was born at Golden Acre, near Edinburgh, 24 June 1801. A gamekeeper's son, he was taken twice as a gillie to the highlands, received a good plain education, but had already begun to commit petty thefts when, in July 1813, he enlisted as a drummer in the Norfolk Militia, then stationed at Edinburgh Castle. George Borrow, who probably saw him in Edinburgh, gave a very fanciful sketch of him in Lavengro. Borrow's "wild, red-headed lad of some fifteen years, his frame lithy as an antelope's, but with prodigious breadth of chest", was then only twelve years old. Next year, when the regiment left for England, Haggart was discharged, and after nine months' more schooling he began an apprenticeship as a millwright.

== Criminal career ==
The firm went bankrupt in April 1817, and the unemployed Haggart soon became a regular pickpocket, burglar and, sometimes, shoplifter haunting every fair and racecourse between Durham and Aberdeen. His luck varied, but was never better than during the first four months, when he and an Irish comrade shared more than three hundred guineas. He was imprisoned six times and escaped four times; and on 10 October 1820, in his escape from Dumfries tolbooth, he knocked out the turnkey with a stone and killed him. He escaped to Ireland, and was sailing at one time for America, at another for France, but in March 1821 was arrested for theft at Clough market. He was recognised, and brought, heavily ironed, from Kilmainham to Dumfries, and thence to Edinburgh. There he was tried on 11 June 1821, and hanged on 18 July.

== The Life of David Haggart ==
Twelve days before the trial he was visited in prison by George Combe, the phrenologist, and between the trial and his execution he partly wrote, partly dictated, an autobiography, which was published by his agent, with Combe's phrenological notes as an appendix, and Haggart's own comments. It is a curious picture of criminal life, the best, and seemingly the most faithful, of its kind, and possesses also some linguistic value, as being mainly written in the Scottish thieves' cant, which contains a good many genuine Romany words. Lord Cockburn, writing from recollection in 1848, declares the whole book to be "a tissue of absolute lies, not of mistakes, or of exaggerations, or of fancies, but of sheer and intended lies. And they all had one object, to make him appear a greater villain than he really was". On the other hand, the contemporaneous account of the trial, so far as it goes, bears out Haggart's narrative; Cockburn is certainly wrong in describing Haggart as "about twenty-five", and in stating that the portrait prefixed professed to be "by his own hand". This autobiography later served as the inspiration for the 1969 movie Sinful Davey. It is available in several reprint formats, but no new edition has ever been issued.
