= Three Strangers =

1946 film by Jean Negulesco

- theatrical release poster
- Directed by: Jean Negulesco
- Written by: John Huston; Howard Koch
- Produced by: Wolfgang Reinhardt
- Starring: Sydney Greenstreet; Geraldine Fitzgerald; Peter Lorre
- Cinematography: Arthur Edeson
- Edited by: George Amy
- Music by: Adolph Deutsch
- Production company: Warner Bros. Pictures
- Distributed by: Warner Bros. Pictures
- Release date: January 28, 1946
- Running time: 92 minutes
- Country: United States
- Language: English
- Budget: $457,000
- Box office: $1,647,000

Three Strangers is a 1946 American film noir crime drama directed by Jean Negulesco and starring Sydney Greenstreet, Geraldine Fitzgerald, and Peter Lorre, and featuring Joan Lorring and Alan Napier. The screenplay was written by John Huston and Howard Koch. It was produced and distributed by Warner Bros. Pictures.

== Plot ==
Crystal Shackleford lures two strangers, solicitor Jerome K. Arbutny and charming and erudite drunkard Johnny West to her London flat on Chinese New Year in 1938 because of her belief that if three strangers make the same wish to an idol of Kwan Yin, Chinese goddess of fortune and destiny, the wish will be granted. Since money will make their dreams come true, the three go in on a sweepstakes ticket for the Grand National horse race together and agree that they will not sell the ticket if it is chosen, but will hold on to it until the race is run. Shackleford would use the money to try to win her estranged husband back, Arbutny to smooth the way for his selection to the prestigious Barrister's Club, and Johnny to buy a bar and live in it.

The stories of the three strangers are revealed. Shackleford's husband David moved to Canada and fell in love with Janet Elliott. He returns, just after Johnny and Arbutny take their leave of Crystal, and demands a divorce, but she refuses. She sees to it that he loses a promotion. She also lies to Janet, telling her that David still loves her and that she is pregnant. The trusting woman believes her and returns to Canada.

With the help of an adoring Icey Crane, Johnny has been hiding out after his drunken participation in a botched robbery that resulted in the death of a policeman. Icey commits perjury in order to provide an alibi for the murderer and ringleader, Bertram Fallon. When a second witness is discredited, Fallon confesses to the robbery but blames the murder on West and the third man involved, Timothy "Gabby" Delaney. Johnny is caught and sentenced to death, but Gabby finds Fallon on his way to prison and stabs him. As he dies in the railway carriage, Fallon clears Johnny.

Arbutny has been speculating in stocks with money from the trust fund of Lady Rhea Belladon, an eccentric widow who believes she can talk with her dead husband. When the stock falls and his margin is called, a desperate Arbutny proposes to Lady Belladon. After consulting with her dead husband, she turns him down. Worse, she says that Lord Belladon wants to have the books checked. Arbutny contemplates suicide, is about to shoot himself but glances in the newspaper and discovers their sweepstakes ticket was drawn in the Grand National.

The three strangers converge on Crystal's flat. Arbutny wants to sell his share of the ticket immediately so he can replace the funds he stole before his crime can be uncovered. Johnny is willing, but Shackleford is adamant that they stick to their original agreement. Arbutny becomes enraged and accidentally kills her with her statue of Kwan Yin. Ironically, they hear on the radio that their horse wins. Johnny points out to Arbutny that the winning ticket has to be destroyed because their agreement and signatures on it would provide a motive for Crystal's murder. They leave the flat, but Arbutny is overcome by guilt, and panics and runs out into the middle of the busy street. Arbutny stops traffic and attracts a crowd, including a policeman, where he confesses to the murder. David Shackleford arrives, intending to shoot his estranged wife for driving Janet away from him, but leaves, shaken, upon discovering that she is already dead.

Johnny returns to the pub, where Icey finds him. Content with having her, he sets the ticket on fire.

== Cast ==
- Sydney Greenstreet as Jerome K. Arbutny
- Geraldine Fitzgerald as Crystal Shackleford
- Peter Lorre as Johnny West
- Joan Lorring as Icey Crane
- Robert Shayne as Bertram Fallon
- Marjorie Riordan as Janet Elliot
- Arthur Shields as Prosecutor
- Rosalind Ivan as Lady Rhea Beladon
- John Alvin as Junior Clerk
- Peter Whitney as Gabby
- Alan Napier as David Shackleford
- Clifford Brooke as Senior Clerk
- Doris Lloyd as Mrs. Proctor
- John Burton as Narrator (uncredited)
- Stanley Logan as "Major" Beach (uncredited)
- Ian Wolfe as Gillkie (uncredited)
- Connie Leon as Flower Woman (uncredited)

== Production ==
Three Strangers was in production from early January to mid-February 1945. Its original title was Three Men and a Girl, and Bette Davis and George Brent were originally to be the leads. At one point, the story was considered for a sequel of sorts to The Maltese Falcon, and Humphrey Bogart, Sydney Greenstreet and Mary Astor were to star. However, according to Robert Osborne of Turner Classic Movies, Warner Bros. discovered the rights to the characters had reverted to Dashiell Hammett, author of the original novel. Because Warners had owned the rights since 1937, actors considered for the role of Jerome K. Arbutny were Lionel Atwill, Donald Crisp, Ian Hunter and Claude Rains, while Miriam Hopkins and Kay Francis were considered to play Crystal Shackelford. For the third starring role, that of Johnny West, Errol Flynn, David Niven, Leslie Howard, Douglas Fairbanks, Jr. and Robert Montgomery were considered. Director Jean Negulesco was a fan of Peter Lorre's work and fought hard to give him the role.

John Huston was inspired to write the story by a wooden figure he bought in an antique shop while working in London. Later, events at a party in his flat suggested to Huston the story of three strangers sharing a sweepstakes ticket. Alfred Hitchcock was at the gathering, and liked the story when Huston told it to him, but nothing came of it. Huston returned to Hollywood, and Warners bought the treatment in 1937. Huston went on to write the script with his friend Howard Koch. When the film finally went into production, Huston was not available to direct it, because he was a lieutenant in the U.S. Army Signal Corps.

Two American release dates for Three Strangers can be found: 28 January 1946 and 16 February 1946. It's possible that the first date is the premiere, and the later one the actual date of general release.

== Reception ==
In its 1946 review, Variety wrote:

Greenstreet overplays to some extent as the attorney who has raided a trust fund, but he still does a good job. Lorre is tops as a drunk who gets involved in a murder of which he's innocent, while Fitzgerald rates as the victim.

Bosley Crowther in The New York Times wrote that same year:

[T]he action [...] is full-bodied melodrama of a shrewd and sophisticated sort. Never so far away from reason that it is wholly incredible but obviously manufactured fiction, it makes a tolerably tantalizing show, reaching some points of fascination in a few of its critical scenes.

According to Warner Bros. records, the film earned $1,033,000 in the U.S. and $614,000 in other markets.
