= Benedict Fitzgerald =

American screenwriter (1949–2024)

- Born: March 9, 1949; New York, U.S.
- Died: January 17, 2024 (aged 74); Marsala, Sicily, Italy
- Education: Harvard College
- Occupation: Screenwriter
- Notable work: The Passion of the Christ; Wise Blood
- Spouse: Karen Mason (m. 1991)
- Father: Robert Fitzgerald

Benedict Fitzgerald (March 9, 1949 – January 17, 2024) was an American screenwriter who co-wrote the screenplay for the 2004 film The Passion of the Christ with its director, Mel Gibson. His other writing credits include an uncredited television screenplay for Moby Dick in 1998 and Wise Blood in 1979. He was a consulting producer on the Paramount+ television series Evil.

== Early life ==
Fitzgerald was born in New York on March 9, 1949. He was the son of Sally and poet/critic Robert Fitzgerald. When he was a child, one of his babysitters was novelist Flannery O'Connor. He graduated from the Portsmouth Abbey School in 1967.

== Lawsuit ==
On February 11, 2008, Fitzgerald filed a lawsuit against Mel Gibson and the production company Icon Productions, alleging the unfair deprivation of compensation and deception on the overall expense of the film production budget after the box office success of the film The Passion of the Christ, including, but not limited to, "fraud, breach of contract & unjust enrichment" seeking unspecified damages. He also sued Vicki Christianson, Icon Distribution, Marquis Films, and Airborne Productions.

According to his lawsuit, Fitzgerald says he "accepted a salary substantially less than what he would have taken had he known the true budget for the film," agreeing to an undisclosed "relatively small salary," a $75,000 production bonus, another $75,000 if the film broke even, and five percent of revenues. Fitzgerald received a loan of $200,000 from Gibson in December 2003 backed by his share of the film's future profits as collateral.

In May 2009, Gibson agreed to an undisclosed settlement with Fitzgerald. Details of the settlement, agreed at Los Angeles Superior Court, were not released. Gibson's representatives did not comment on the settlement.

== Death ==
Fitzgerald died in Marsala, Sicily, on January 17, 2024, at the age of 74.

== Filmography ==
=== Film ===
- Wise Blood (1979)
- The Passion of the Christ (2004)
- Mary Mother of Christ (TBA)
- A Good Man Is Hard to Find (TBA)

=== Television ===
- Heart of Darkness (1993)
- Zelda (1993)
- In Cold Blood (1996)
- Moby Dick (1998) (uncredited)
- Evil (2020) (consulting producer)
