= Sinful Davey =

1969 film by John Huston

- Theatrical poster
- Directed by: John Huston
- Screenplay by: James R. Webb
- Based on: The Life of David Haggart by David Haggart
- Produced by: William N. Graf
- Starring: John Hurt; Pamela Franklin; Nigel Davenport; Ronald Fraser; Robert Morley
- Cinematography: Edward Scaife; Freddie Young
- Edited by: Russell Lloyd
- Music by: Ken Thorne
- Production company: The Mirisch Corporation
- Distributed by: United Artists
- Release date: 7 May 1969
- Running time: 95 minutes
- Countries: United Kingdom; United States
- Language: English
- Budget: $3 million
- Box office: $550,000

Sinful Davey is a 1969 picaresque adventure/crime/comedy film directed by John Huston and starring John Hurt, Pamela Franklin, and, in an early appearance, Fionnula Flanagan. Huston's daughter Anjelica Huston appears uncredited as an extra.

John Huston later said the film was "very good" but "spoiled beyond recognition" by the producers.

== Plot ==
In a British prison in the early 1800s, Scottish rogue Davey Haggart is seen writing his memoirs while waiting to be hanged. Most of his story is told in flashback with voice-over narration by Davey. His story begins as he is seen marching and beating a drum for the British Army, but he quickly deserts by jumping off a bridge with his drum and floating away. His father had been a highwayman who was hanged at the age of 21 for attempting to rob the Duke of Argyll and that Davey is determined to exceed the number of his father's crimes. Annie, a childhood friend who is in love with him, follows him at different times, sometimes getting him out of trouble but hoping that he will reform.

Davey winds up becoming a partner with MacNab, a pickpocket and thief, sometimes teaming up with other criminals. Eventually, the two land in prison, where Davey is able to break into the women's quarters and start a raucous party with the female prisoners, led by Jean Carlisle. Davey is bailed out by Annie, but he then enables MacNab's escape and turns to highway robbery, following in his father's footsteps. Constable Richardson, the local officer, tries to recruit Annie to help capture Davey, but she refuses.

Davey goes into hiding in the Scottish highlands, but still gets into trouble. Almost by accident, Davey foils an attempted assault and robbery of Sir James Graham, a nephew of the Duke of Argyll, who invites Davey to his uncle's manor. While Davey wins the favor of the Duke and his family, MacNab, Jean, Annie, and Constable Richardson also converge on the estate at different times. Davey sets up an elaborate robbery of guests at a grand ball hosted by the Duchess of Argyll, but Annie then returns the stolen jewels. When Richardson recognizes Davey as the thief he has been seeking, a lengthy chase ensues, with Davey stealing a horse and riding away until he is knocked off by a low-hanging tree branch.

The story returns to Davey's prison cell, as he finishes writing his memoirs, expecting his execution to take place soon. Annie and MacNab, however, are able to sabotage the gallows so that Davey escapes once again, riding away with Annie.

== Cast ==
- John Hurt as Davey Haggart
- Pamela Franklin as Annie
- Nigel Davenport as Richardson
- Ronald Fraser as MacNab
- Robert Morley as Duke of Argyll
- Fidelma Murphy as Jean Carlisle
- Maxine Audley as Duchess of Argyll
- Fionnula Flanagan as Penelope
- Donal McCann as Sir James Campbell
- Allan Cuthbertson as Captain Douglas
- Eddie Byrne as Yorkshire Bill
- Niall MacGinnis as Boots Simpson
- Noel Purcell as Jock
- Judith Furse as Mary
- Francis de Wolff as Andrew
- Paul Farrell as Bailiff

== Production ==
Director John Huston and producer Walter Mirisch clashed several times during and after the film's production, especially in regard to a musical score originally composed by John Barry, the casting of Huston's daughter Anjelica, and the final editing of the film. Critic David Sterrit describes the final product as "a box-office fiasco that nobody has particularly wanted to own. But it's also an interesting document from Huston's tired period, showing what can happen when a great director and a major studio clash over a project that was probably fated from the beginning not to click."

The film is based on the autobiography of David Haggart titled The Life of David Haggart. The film, about a Scottish rogue, was filmed in Ireland, and much of the cast have Irish accents instead of the more accurate Scottish accent.

Four members of the film unit making the picture in County Wicklow crashed in their Cessna plane at Glenmalure in 1967. All the occupants of the plane were injured to some extent, but John O'Connor, the location manager, was the most seriously injured. Huston left the film location to visit the hospital and stopped the filming.

== Critical reception ==
The Monthly Film Bulletin wrote: "Huston's works, like those of Graham Greene, seem to be falling into two categories, the serious and the '"entertainments". When he works in his adopted country, Ireland, entertainment seems to be the order of the day. Not that Sinful Davey is on a level with that other vastly enjoyable Huston joke The List of Adrian Messenger, an altogether smoother piece of work, but it does include the inevitable hunting scene. Davey is a sort of poor man's Tom Jones, based allegedly on the memoirs of the real Davey Haggart whose gifts seem to have been better suited to a work of fiction. Not that Huston or his scriptwriters have paid the slightest attention to plausibility; they seem to be content to recount Haggart's improbable adventures with gusto, and their enthusiasm has infected the cast, all of whom play with tremendous zest. ... It will also be enormous fun for youngsters of all ages and it is very difficult to see why the British censor has seen fit to classify it 'A'."

TV Guide says – "A good cast overcomes the somewhat heavy-handed direction of Huston in this Tom Jones-inspired comedy".
