= Emjo Basshe =

American dramatist

- Born: Emmanuel Iode Abarbanel Basshe or Emanuel Joseph Jochelman; January 20, 1898; Vilnius, Lithuania (at the time, part of the Russian Empire)
- Died: October 29, 1939 (aged 41); New York City, US
- Education: Columbia University
- Occupation: Playwright
- Writing career
- Notable awards: Guggenheim Fellowship (1931)

Emjo Basshe (born Emmanuel Iode Abarbanel Basshe or Emanuel Joseph Jochelman; January 20, 1898 – October 29, 1939) was a Lithuanian-born Jewish American playwright of Spanish ancestry and theatre director who co-founded New York City's New Playwrights Theatre in 1926. A recipient of 1931 Guggenheim Fellowship for creative work in theatre and drama, and one of the initial members, in 1935, of the Communist Party-founded League of American Writers, he won first prize for Thunderbolt, also referenced as Thunder-Clock, which was judged in a University of Chicago competition to be the "best unproduced long play of the year 1935".

== Work with Provincetown Playhouse ==
Born in Vilnius, the capital of Lithuania, then a part of the Russian Empire as Emmanuel Jochelman, he was the son of Rivka Tchech and Dr. David Solomon Jochelman, who would become an eminent Zionist leader in England, along with Israel Zangwill, in the leadership of the Jewish Territorial Organization. Following his divorce, David Jochelman brought 14-year-old Emmanuel to New York City in 1912, apparently leaving him in the care of close women friends, before he returned to Europe, where he remarried and committed himself to the search for a Jewish homeland.Graduating from Columbia University in 1919, and now known as Emjo Basshe (a portmanteau of Emmanuel and Jochelman, with his surname borrowed from a maternal ancestor), he began his theatrical career with the Provincetown Playhouse on Greenwich Village's MacDougal Street and, in 1920, went to Massachusetts, working with Boston's Peabody Playhouse, then Chelsea Arts Theatre and Cambridge's Castle Square Players, all during 1920–22. Returning to Provincetown Playhouse, he remained until the premiere, on November 6, 1925, of his play, Adam Solitaire, directed by Stanley Howlett, and featuring 19-year-old John Huston among the production's eighteen Provincetown Players, named after and connected with the founders and players of Massachusetts' Provincetown Playhouse on Cape Cod. Closing night, after 17 performances, was two weeks later and Basshe moved to Pennsylvania, becoming director of the Stage Repertory of Philadelphia, where his three short plays, The Bitter Fantasy, The Star and Soil were presented.

== Co-founder of the New Playwrights Theatre ==
Again returning to New York, Basshe co-founded, with four others including John Dos Passos, and with financial support from Otto Kahn, the New Playwrights Theatre, initially finding a temporary home at the 52nd Street Theatre, where it premiered, on March 9, 1927, his new play, Earth, directed by Russell Wright and Hemsley Winfield. Closing night, after 24 performances, was at the end of the month. Eight months later, On November 29, 1927, in the theatre's home base at another Greenwich Village address, 38 Commerce Street, Basshe's new play, Centuries, set among Jewish residents of a New York City tenement house, had its premiere. Directed by the author, the production had a cast of 27, including future film star Franchot Tone, and lasted for 39 performances, closing in January.

Continuing as a director, Basshe next helmed the Playhouse's production of Upton Sinclair's prison-based drama, Singing Jailbirds, which featured future character star, Lionel Stander, as one of the prisoners. Premiering on December 6, 1928, the play lasted 79 performances, closing in February. Provincetown Playhouse dissolved in April 1929 and Basshe pursued his career as a Broadway director at other venues, co-supervising North Carolina playwright Paul Green's musical drama, Roll, Sweet Chariot, set, according to its description, in "A Negro Village Somewhere in the South". The production, with 51 cast members, premiered at the Cort Theatre on October 2, 1934, and lasted 7 performances. Another Green play directed by Basshe, Turpentine, opened at the Lafayette Theatre on June 26, 1936, and closed in August, following 62 performances.

On May 13, a month before the premiere of Turpentine, Basshe's anti-war satire, The Snickering Horses, with a cast of 34, was staged at Daly's 63rd Street Theatre as the concluding presentation of Works Progress Administration's Federal Theatre Project Experimental Theatre three-performance cycle of three one-act plays, with the other two being George Bernard Shaw's Great Catherine: Whom Glory Still Adores and, condensed into one act by Alfred Saxe, Molière's The Miser. In its synopsis of The Snickering Horses, New Theatre Magazine describes "..the horses who pull the stuck artillery out of the mud, and are blown to bits,—with the soldiers—only the horses are smarter. They know enough to snicker at the hocus-pocus of 'dying for God and Country'. The soldiers, blown to chunks, are now on a par with the ice-packed five-star beef shipped East to feed the army..." A few months earlier, writing in the January 7, 1936 (no. 18) issue of the Communist Party-affiliated publication, The New Masses, Basshe praised Clara Weatherwax's novel, Marching! Marching! with the words, "[T]he workers won't have any trouble understanding it, [A]nd if they do stumble here and there, they won't mind learning because this is of them and for them."

== Family ==
In 1929, Basshe married Doris Troutman, an actress from North Carolina whom he met when she was performing with his theater group. Their only child, daughter Emjo Basshe II, later known as Jo, was born in 1930, and the family lived in Greenwich Village. It was an unhappy marriage, the couple separated years before Basshe's death, and Doris remarried in 1940.

== Death in 1939 ==
In January 1939, Basshe staged a production of three one-act plays: Paul Vincent Carroll's Ireland-based, The Coggerers (later renamed The Conspirators), Jean Giraudoux's Mr. Banks of Birmingham and Josephinna Niggli's The Red Velvet Goat, which opened at the Hudson Theatre on January 20, 1939, and closed the following day, after three performances.

Emjo Basshe was admitted to Bellevue Hospital on October 11, 1939, and died there on October 29, at age 41. In its October 29 obituary, The New York Times stated that he "died last night" at the age of 40 and that "[H]is home was at Rock Tavern, Orange County, N. Y."
