= Mary Nell Santacroce =

American actress

Mary Nell McKoin Santacroce (May 25, 1918 – February 17, 1999) was an American actress. She has appeared in such films as Wise Blood (1979), The War (1994) and Something to Talk About (1995). She was the mother of actress Dana Ivey.

== Biography ==
Mary Nell McKoin was born in Atlanta, Georgia, in 1918. She was a graduate of both the University of Georgia and Emory University. From 1948-65, she taught speech and drama at the Georgia Institute of Technology. She also taught at Georgia State University from 1965 until 1972. Her career in film and television began relatively late, with sporadic appearances from 1965 and more regular appearances from the end of the 1970s, when she was already around 60 years old.

She had two children, daughter Dana and son John, from her marriage to Hugh Ivey, which ended in divorce. She had another son, Eric, from her marriage to Dante Santacroce, her widower.

Santacroce died on February 17, 1999, at her home in Atlanta from leukemia and bone cancer.

== Select filmography ==
- The Million Dollar Dixie Deliverance (1978)
- Wise Blood (1979)
- The Private Eyes (1980)
- Mutant (1984)
- Impure Thoughts (1986)
- Not Without My Daughter (1991)
- Alex Haley's Queen (1993)
- Silent Cries (1993)
- Class of '61 (1993)
- The Yearling (1994)
- A Simple Twist of Fate (1994)
- The War (1994)
- Something to Talk About (1995)
