= Charles Kaufman (screenwriter) =

American writer (1904–1991)

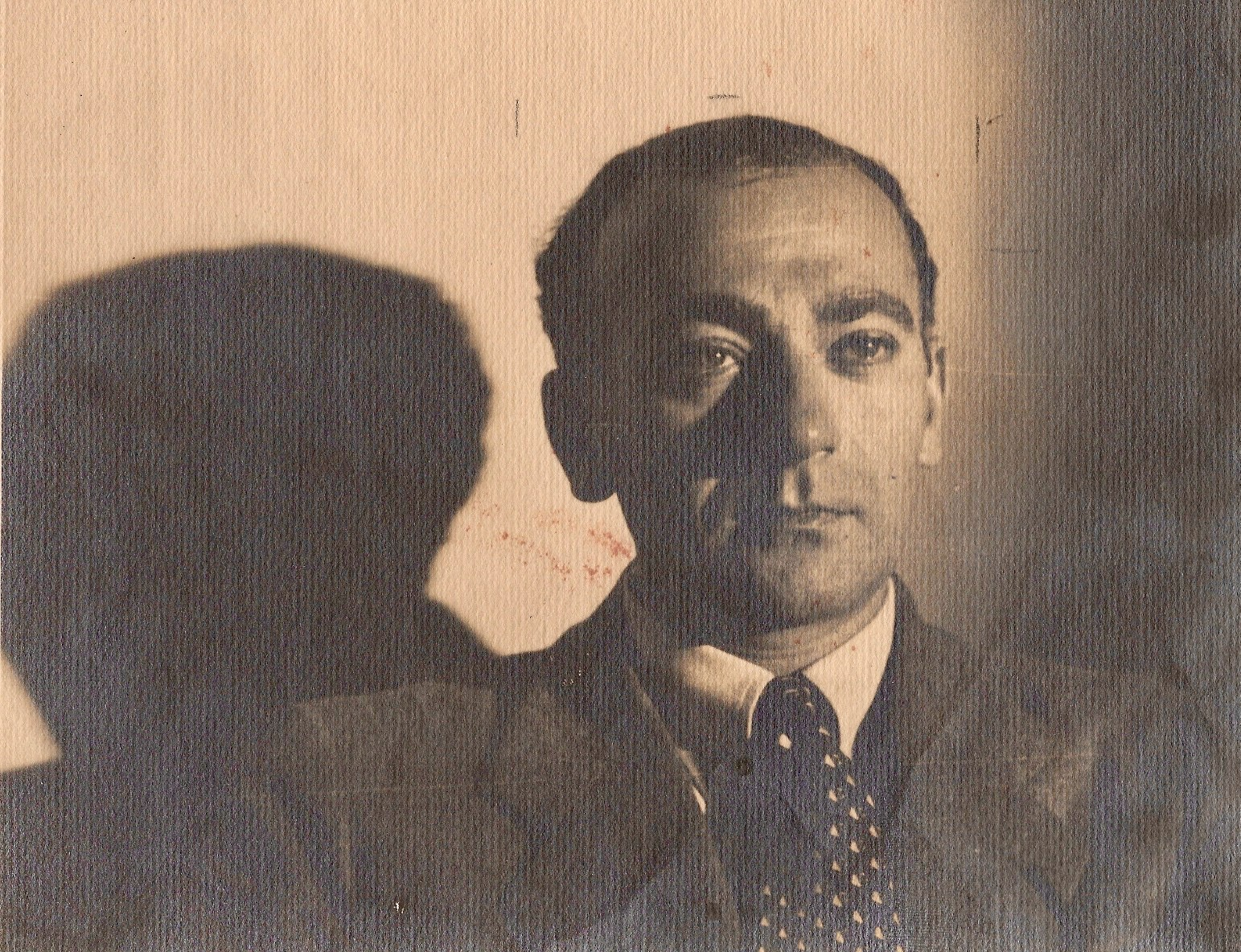
- Kaufman in 1939
- Born: October 20, 1904; Paterson, New Jersey, United States
- Died: May 2, 1991 (aged 86); Los Angeles, California, United States
- Occupation: Screenwriter

Charles Kaufman (October 20, 1904 – May 2, 1991) was an American novelist, writer, and screenwriter.

== Biography ==
Kaufman was a short story writer for The New Yorker. As a teenager, books by Joseph Conrad inspired Kaufman to go to sea. At the age of sixteen, he signed on a freighter going to Turk's Island. He later worked as a bellboy on an ocean liner sailing to Bremen. His experiences in World War II (he was a member of a combat camera crew in the Battle of Leyte) led to a career as a screenwriter. His screenplay for the 1958 film The Story of Esther Costello was nominated for a BAFTA Award for Best British Screenplay. Along with Wolfgang Reinhart he was nominated for an Academy Award for Original Screenplay in 1962 for the film Freud: The Secret Passion.

In 2010, Let There Be Light, whose screenplay Kaufman wrote with John Huston, was selected for preservation in the United States National Film Registry by the Library of Congress as being "culturally, historically, or aesthetically significant." This documentary film about the treatment for post-traumatic stress disorder (PTSD) of soldiers returning from World War II has been described as one of the most groundbreaking and acclaimed government films.

Kaufman was the author of three published books: Fiesta in Manhattan (Morrow, 1939), After the Dream (Avon Books, 1977), and the children's book The Frog and the Beanpole (Lothrop, Lee & Shepard Books, 1980).

Kaufman died of pneumonia in Los Angeles in 1991.

== Selected works ==
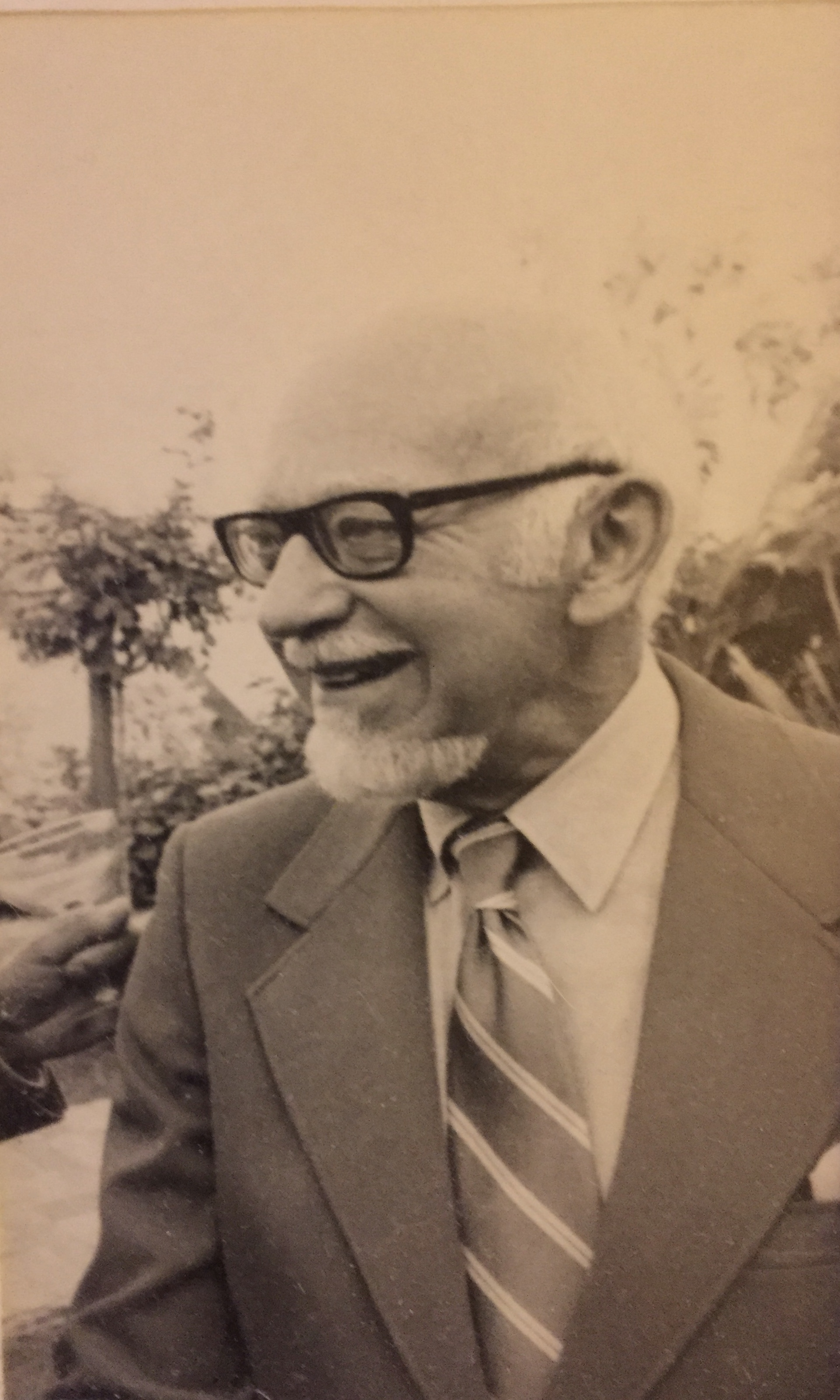
Charles A. Kaufman in 1970

=== Novels ===
- Fiesta in Manhattan (Morrow, 1939)
- After the Dream (Avon Books, 1977)
- The Frog and the Beanpole (Lothrop, Lee & Shepard Books, 1980)

=== Screenplays ===
- Saturday's Heroes (1937)
- Breakfast for Two (1937)
- Maid's Night Out (1938)
- The Saint in New York (1938)
- Blond Cheat (1938)
- Exposed (1938)
- When Tomorrow Comes (1939)
- Model Wife (1941)
- Paris Calling (1942)
- Let There Be Light (1946)
- Cynthia (1947)
- Return to Paradise (1953)
- The Racers (1955)
- The Story of Esther Costello (1957)
- South Seas Adventure (1958)
- Bridge to the Sun (1961)
- Freud (1962)
