= Wolfgang Reinhardt (producer) =

German film producer and screenwriter

- Born: 13 December 1908; Berlin, German Empire
- Died: 28 July 1979 (aged 70); Rome, Italy
- Occupation(s): Film producer Screenwriter
- Years active: 1939–1973
- Spouse: Lally Reinhardt
- Children: 3, including Michael Reinhardt
- Parent(s): Max Reinhardt; Else Heims
- Relatives: Gottfried Reinhardt (brother)

Wolfgang Reinhardt (13 December 1908 – 28 July 1979) was a German film producer and screenwriter. He was best known for co-writing the screenplay for the film Freud: The Secret Passion (1962), which earned him Academy Award and Writers Guild of America Award nominations.

== Filmography ==
- Juarez (1939 - writer)
- Dr. Ehrlich's Magic Bullet (1940)
- My Love Came Back (1940)
- The Male Animal (1942)
- Three Strangers (1946)
- Caught (1949)
- Stazione Termini (1953)
- Ludwig II (1955)
- Die Trapp-Familie (1956)
- Freud (1962)
- Hitler: The Last Ten Days (1973)
