= Amalia Freud =

Mother of Sigmund Freud (1835–1930)

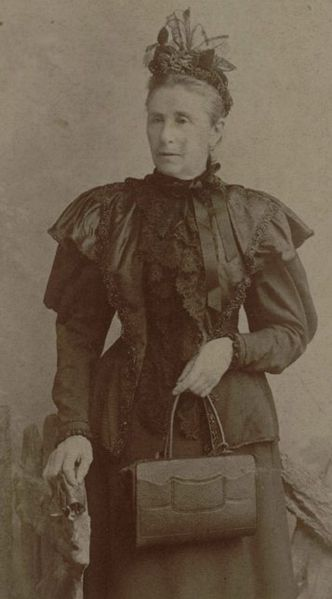
- Amalia Freud in 1903
- Born: Amalia Malka Nathansohn; 18 August 1835; Brody, Kingdom of Galicia and Lodomeria (present-day Ukraine)
- Died: 12 September 1930 (aged 95); Vienna, First Austrian Republic
- Known for: Being the mother of Sigmund Freud
- Spouse: Jacob Freud
- Children: 8, including Sigmund Freud
- Relatives: Ernst L. Freud (grandson); Anna Freud (granddaughter)

Amalia Malka Nathansohn Freud (née Nathansohn; 18 August 1835 – 12 September 1930) was the mother of Sigmund Freud. She was born in Brody in the Kingdom of Galicia and Lodomeria to Jakob Nathanson and Sara Wilenz and later grew up in Odesa, where her mother came from (both cities are located in modern-day Ukraine). She was married to Jacob Freud in 1855.

Amalia Freud died of tuberculosis in Vienna at the age of 95.

== Children ==
On 6 May 1856, when Amalia Freud was still 20 years old, she gave birth to her first child by her husband Jacob Freud, Sigmund Schlomo, who became a famous neurologist and the founder of psychoanalysis.

Amalia was almost always pregnant in the decade following Sigmund's birth, giving birth to seven more children in just nine years, of which six lived to adulthood. However, none of her other children became as renowned as their eldest brother. They are enumerated below in the consecutive order of their births:

- Julius (October 1857 – 15 April 1858), died in infancy
- Anna (31 December 1858 – 11 March 1955)
- Regina Debora "Rosa" (born on 21 March 1860, deported to Treblinka on 23 September 1942)
- Marie "Mitzi" (born on 22 March 1861, deported to Treblinka on 23 September 1942)
- Esther Adolfine "Dolfi" (23 July 1862 – 5 February 1943 in Theresienstadt)
- Pauline Regine "Pauli" (born on 3 May 1864, deported to Treblinka on 23 September 1942)
- Alexander Gotthold Efraim (19 April 1866 – 23 April 1943)

== Character ==
Amalia was considered by her grandchildren to be an intelligent, strong-willed, quick-tempered but egotistical personality. Ernest Jones saw her as lively and humorous, with a strong attachment to her eldest son whom she called "mein goldener Sigi".

=== Relationship with eldest son ===
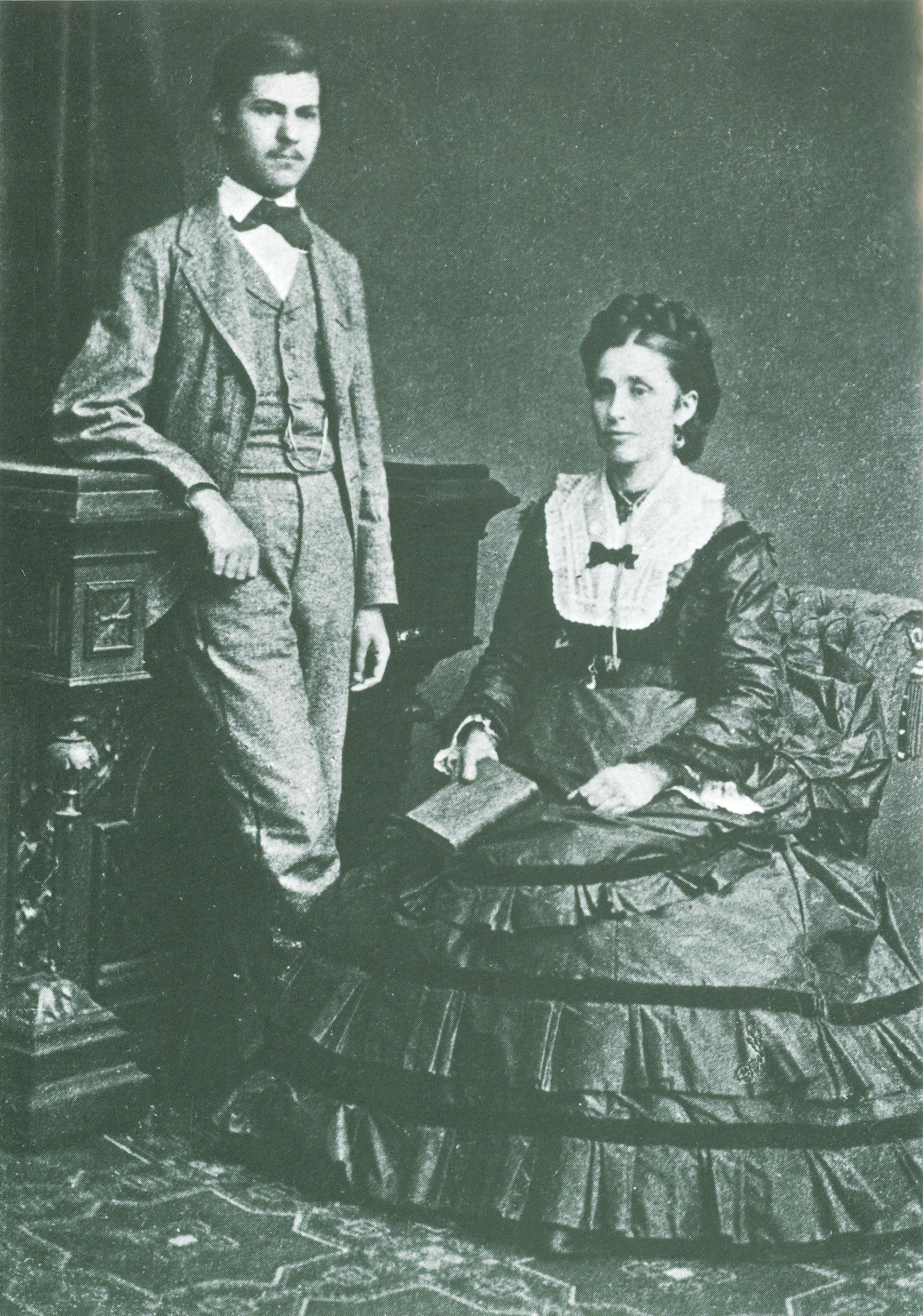
Freud with her son Sigmund, c. 1872

Just as Amalia idolised her eldest son, so there is evidence that the latter in turn idealised his mother, whose domineering hold over his life he never fully analysed. He did however recount a railway journey with her at the age of 4 amongst his earliest memories and also recalled her instruction in German reading and writing. Late in life, he would term the mother-son relationship "the most perfect, the most free from ambivalence of all human relationships. A mother can transfer to her son the ambition she has been obliged to suppress in herself". His tendency to split off and repudiate hostile elements in the relationship would be repeated with significant figures in his life such as his fiancée and Wilhelm Fliess.

== Later life and death ==
In August 1930, Amalia Freud celebrated her 95th birthday at Bad Ischl with her son Sigmund. By then, her health had deteriorated considerably. Freud recorded that she was suffering from gangrene of the leg and that her pain was severe enough to require continuous morphine. He noted that she was often apathetic, but that she still recognized visitors and showed interest in them when she became more alert.

For at least ten years before her death, Amalia had lived a secluded life and was cared for by her unmarried daughter Adolfine ("Dolfi"). She died in her bedroom in Vienna at 8 a.m. on 12 September 1930, aged 95. Freud regarded her death as a relief after her suffering, writing to Max Eitingon that the pain from the gangrene in her legs had made morphine indispensable during her final days.

Freud was 74 when his mother died. Three days after her death, he wrote to Ernest Jones that he felt an "increase in personal freedom", explaining that he had long been troubled by the thought that his mother might have to learn of his own death. He also expressed satisfaction that she had finally obtained relief after such a long life. Freud did not attend her funeral; his daughter Anna represented him there.

== See also ==
- Freud family
