= Jacob Freud =

Father of Sigmund Freud (1815–1896)

- Born: 18 December 1815
- Died: 23 October 1896 (aged 80)
- Spouse: Amalia Freud
- Relatives: Ernst L. Freud (grandson); Anna Freud (granddaughter)

Jacob Kolloman Freud (Yiddish: יעקב קאלמאן פרויד; 18 December 1815 – 23 October 1896) was the father of Sigmund Freud, the founder of psychoanalysis.

Born in town of Tysmenytsia in the Kingdom of Galicia and Lodomeria (now in Ukraine), and from a Hasidic background though himself an enlightened Jew of the Haskalah, he mainly earned his living as a wool merchant.

== Families ==
Jacob Freud was the son of Schlomo Freud and Pepi, née Hoffmann. Jacob Freud married three times, with two children coming from his first marriage, and eight children from his third marriage to Amalia Freud, twenty years his junior. His first wife was Sally, and his second wife was Rebecca. Jacob's eldest son from his first marriage became a father a year before Sigmund - the first son of Jacob's third marriage - was born; so that Sigmund was an uncle at birth, with his nephew John a constant (and older) playmate in his early years. Ernest Jones speculates that the unusual family background may have prompted Sigmund - the eldest but third son - into an early interest in family dynamics.

== Character ==
By all accounts, Jacob Freud was a genial, unassuming character with a "Micawberish" streak of optimism: Sigmund would write warmly of "his characteristic mixture of deep wisdom and fantastic lightheartedness". Yet Jacob's meekness in the face of antisemitic bullying also disturbed Sigmund profoundly. Much of the latter's ambition, his combativeness, and his subsequent quest for powerful father figures such as Ernst Wilhelm von Brücke and Josef Breuer, may be traced back to his ambivalence about his own yielding and 'vague' father.

== See also ==
- Father complex
- Family nexus
- Freud family
- Wilhelm Fliess
