= Emma Eckstein =

Austrian author (1865–1924)

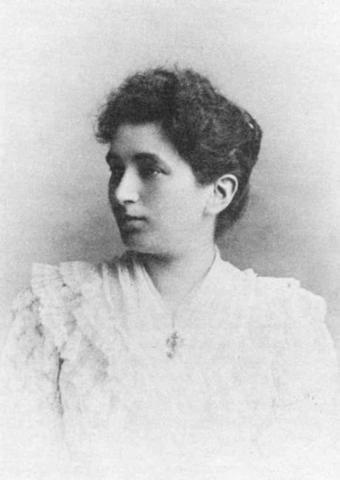
- Emma Eckstein (1895) (Note: The original photograph is kept in the Library of Congress; see Eli Zaretsky: Freuds Jahrhundert, Die Geschichte der Psychoanalyse, Munich (dtv), 2009, p. 619)
- Born: 28 January 1865; Vienna, Austrian Empire
- Died: July 30, 1924 (aged 59); Vienna, Austria
- Relatives: Friedrich Eckstein (brother); Gustav Eckstein (brother); Therese Schlesinger (sister)

Emma Eckstein (1865–1924) was an Austrian author. She was "one of Sigmund Freud's most important patients and, for a short period of time around 1897, became a psychoanalyst herself". She has been described as "the first woman analyst", who became "both colleague and patient" for Freud. As analyst, while working mainly in the area of sexual and social hygiene, she also explored how 'daydreams, those "parasitic plants", invaded the life of young girls'.

Ernest Jones placed her with such figures as Lou Andreas-Salomé and Joan Riviere as a "type of woman, of a more intellectual and perhaps masculine cast ... [who] played a part in his life, accessory to his male friends though of a finer calibre."

== Life ==
Emma Eckstein was born in Vienna on 28 January 1865 to a well-known bourgeois family with close connections to Freud: one of her brothers was Gustav Eckstein (1875–1916), a social democrat and associate of Karl Kautsky, the leader of the Socialist Party; and a sister, Therese Schlesinger, a socialist, was one of the first women members of parliament. Another brother, Friedrich, appears (anonymously) in Freud's Civilization and its Discontents as a 'friend of mine, whose insatiable craving for knowledge has led him to make the most unusual experiments', including 'the practices of yoga...He sees in them a physiological basis, as it were, for much of the wisdom of mysticism'.

Eckstein was active in the Viennese women's movement, collaborating with Dokumente der Frauen and Neues Frauenleben.

After an operation in 1910, however, Eckstein took to her couch, and remained a partial invalid until she died on 30 July 1924 of a cerebral hemorrhage.

== Analysis ==
When she was 27, she went to Freud, seeking treatment for vague symptoms including stomach ailments and slight depression related to menstruation. Freud diagnosed Eckstein as suffering from hysteria and believed that she masturbated to excess; masturbation in those days was considered dangerous to mental health. Her 'treatment lasted something in the region of three years – one of the most protracted and detailed of Freud's early cases'.

In her analysis, Emma Eckstein "supplied Freud with the material that would allow him to theorize hysteric symptomology...taught Freud about 'the no-man's land between fantasy and memory, resonating with sadistic acts and fantasies of a former historical epoch'." She told Freud that “On two occasions, when she was a child of eight, she had gone into a shop to buy some sweets and the shopkeeper had grabbed at her genitals through her clothes. In spite of this first experience she had gone to the shop a second time, after which she stopped away. Afterwards she reproached herself for having gone a second time [...] And in fact a 'bad conscience' by which she was oppressed could be traced back to this experience.” Her "eager collaboration in her analysis gave Freud much precious material...contributed substantial changes and fundamental new elements to his theories: the wish theory of psychosis and dream; the transferential reconstruction of her early pleasures...fantastic scenes from her inner life." In particular, Freud's theory of deferred action owed much to "Emma Eckstein's twinned scenes in shops.... 'Now this case is typical of repression in hysteria. We invariably find that a memory has been repressed which has only become a trauma through deferred action'."

== Surgery ==
Freud was at the time under the influence of his friend and collaborator Wilhelm Fliess, an ear, nose, and throat specialist. Fliess, whom Freud had called "the Kepler of biology", had developed theories today considered pseudoscientific, including the belief that sexual problems were linked to the nose by a supposed nasogenital connection. Fliess had been treating "nasal reflex neurosis" by cauterizing the inside of the nose under local anesthesia. Fliess conjectured that if temporary cauterization was useful, surgery would yield more permanent results. He began operating on the noses of patients he diagnosed with the disorder, including Eckstein and Freud.

His surgery proved disastrous, resulting in profuse, recurrent nasal bleeding; Fliess had left a half-metre of gauze in Eckstein's nasal cavity, the subsequent removal of which left her permanently disfigured. Though aware of Fliess's culpability, Freud fled from the remedial surgery in horror, he could only bring himself to delicately intimate in his correspondence to Fliess the nature of his disastrous role and in subsequent letters maintained a tactful silence on the matter or else returned to the face-saving topic of Eckstein's hysteria. Freud ultimately reasserted his full confidence in Fliess's competence, making Eckstein responsible for the catastrophe by concluding that her post-operative haemorrhages were "wish-bleedings", caused by her hysterical longing for the affection of others.

Guilt over the episode has been identified as contributing to the dream of Irma's injection in The Interpretation of Dreams: "Max Schur grasped right away the significance of the episode to the 'Irma' dream...in his paper on the specimen dream."

== Seduction theory ==
Eckstein is also associated with Freud's seduction theory. In 1897, Freud cites her analytic findings to Fliess as support for his "so-called seduction theory, the claim that all neuroses are the consequences of an adult's, usually a father's, sexual abuse of a child". Freud wrote that "Eckstein deliberately treated his patient in such a manner as not to give her the slightest hint of what would emerge from the unconscious and in the process obtained from her...the identical scenes with the father".

Jeffrey Masson in his assault on Freud's abandonment of the seduction theory makes much of Eckstein's role, linking Freud's "abandonment" of her position with respect to the Fliess surgery to his "abandonment" of her evidence for the paternal etiology of neurosis: for the idea that "all neurotic patients ... had been sexually abused by one parent or the other".

Yet while few (since Schur) would dissent that in regard to the failed surgery "Freud's evasiveness is blatant.... Freud was eager to protect Fliess from the obvious charge of careless, almost fatal malpractice", there is at the same time much to suggest that "as far as the seduction theory is concerned, Eckstein is a red herring ... no more relevant than Freud's other patients. The fact that Masson lavishes so much attention on her...[is that] Emma Eckstein is for him a woman whom Freud and Fliess abused. She is thus the prototypical psychoanalytic victim ... this symbolic function".

== In popular culture ==
- Eckstein appears as a character in Joseph Skibell's 2010 novel A Curable Romantic.
- The song "Emma Eckstein's Nose Job" was released as a single in 2010 by Danish musician Anders Thode.

== Sources ==
- Appignanesi, Lisa; Forrester, John (2005). Freud's women. London: Phoenix. ISBN 978-0-7538-1916-6. OCLC 57381021.
- Bronfen, Elisabeth (2014). The Knotted Subject: Hysteria and Its Discontents. Princeton Legacy Library. Princeton University Press. ISBN 978-1-4008-6473-7.
- Gay, Peter (2006) [1988]. Freud: A Life for Our Time. Little Books, Limited. ISBN 978-1-904435-53-2. PsycNET 2006-06360-000.
- Robinson, Paul A. (1993). Freud and His Critics. University of California Press. ISBN 978-0-520-08029-4.
- Chapter 3: "Freud, Fliess, and Emma Eckstein", pp. 55–106. And "Appendix A. Freud and Emma Eckstein" pp. 233–250. In Masson, Jeffrey Moussaieff (1984) The Assault on Truth: Freud's Suppression of the Seduction Theory, Farrar, Straus and Giroux, New York, ISBN 0-374-10642-8
