= Ernst von Fleischl-Marxow =

Austrian physiologist and physician (1846–1891)

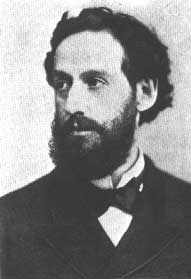
Ernst von Fleischl-Marxow

Ernst von Fleischl-Marxow, also Ernst Fleischl von Marxow (5 August 1846, Vienna – 22 October 1891, Vienna), was an Austrian physiologist and physician who became known for his important investigations on the electrical activity of nerves and the brain. "He also invented various optical measuring instruments, such as the spectropolarimeter and the hematometer." Fleischl-Marxow is remembered for Sigmund Freud's prescribing cocaine to treat his morphine addiction, which resulted in Fleischl-Marxow's becoming addicted to cocaine as well as morphine.

He was born as Ernst Fleischl, the son of Karl Fleischl (1818–1893) and his wife Ida (née Marx). In 1875, Karl Fleischl was ennobled by Emperor Franz Joseph and granted the hereditary title of "Edler von Marxow" in the Austrian nobility. His son's style therefore changed to Ernst Fleischl Edler von Marxow, which he usually used in shortened form as Ernst von Fleischl-Marxow.

Ernst von Fleischl-Marxow studied medicine in the University of Vienna, Austria. He started his scientific career as a research assistant in the laboratory of Ernst Wilhelm von Brücke (1819–1892), and later as an assistant, in the same university, to the eminent pathologist Carl von Rokitansky (1804–1878). However, an accident while he was dissecting a cadaver injured his thumb, which became infected and had to be amputated, interrupting his activities in anatomical pathology. Thus, he had to turn to physiology, and he came back to von Brücke's laboratory in Vienna after studying for a year with Carl Ludwig (1816–1895), another famous physiologist at the University of Leipzig, Germany, obtaining his doctoral degree in medicine in 1874.

In the first phase of his career in neurophysiology, Fleischl-Marxow dedicated himself to electrophysiology of nerves and muscles, then a research field of increasing prestige, after the pioneering investigations of Emil du Bois-Reymond (1818–1896), who had discovered the action potentials of axons. This field highly benefited from the technical developments occurring in the physical sciences, particularly new devices which were invented to work with small electric potentials and currents. Since biological tissues have extremely low levels of electrical activity (in the range of microvolts), neurophysiology's progress had to wait for them. Like many German physiologists of his time, Fleischl-Marxow had a good knowledge and ability with physics, and invented a number of devices for the purpose of his studies, particularly the reonome (a kind of rheostat, or variable resistor used to control finely the intensity of an electrical stimulus). He also adapted the Lippmann's capillary electrometer in order to use it for measuring subtle bioelectrical phenomena.

From the bioelectricity of nerves, Fleischl-Marxow turned his attention, from 1876 on, to the global electrical activity of the cerebral hemispheres. Neuroanatomists had already determined at the time that its nervous tissue was also composed of cells (the neurons), with their bodies mainly located in the gray matter, and filamentary prolongations, the dendrites and the axons. Thus, it was only natural to assume that they would also display electrical activity. This important discovery, however, had not been made until that time, because many desynchronized electrical potentials with different polarities produce a cumulative global potential which is actually very small and difficult to detect with the sensitivity range of the measuring devices available at the time. Despite this, Fleischl-Marxow was able to prove for the first time that the peripheral stimulation of sensory organs, such as vision and hearing were able to provoke event-related small electrical potential swings on the surface of the cerebral cortex which was related to the projection of those senses. Strangely, however, Fleischl-Marxow did not publish his results, choosing instead to deposit them in a bank safe, with instructions to reveal them in 1883 only. Meanwhile, the first publications about what was later to be called the electroencephalogram came to light, independently demonstrated by Richard Caton (1842–1926), in Great Britain, and Adolf Beck (1863–1942) in Poland, both using laboratory animals.

In 1880, Fleischl-Marxow became a full professor at the University of Vienna and was nominated a correspondent member of the Austrian Academy of Sciences. He also devoted part of his research to physiological optics, making important discoveries on the distribution of the optic nerve on the retina, and the optical characteristics of the cornea. With his increasing knowledge in optical physics, he developed several optical measurement instruments, such as a spectropolarimeter and a hematometer (a device used for measuring the content of hemoglobin in the blood), which was named in his honor, and which for many years found wide application in laboratory medicine and diagnostic hematology.

For many years, Fleischl-Marxow labored under intense personal suffering, due to chronic painful complications of his amputation. Because of this, he became addicted to morphine and heroin (a synthetic derivative of morphine, but much more potent). Sigmund Freud, then a Viennese neurologist, was one of his most intimate friends, and had the highest opinion of him:

A most distinguished man, for whom both nature and upbringing have done their best. Rich, trained in all physical exercises, with the stamp of genius in his energetic features, handsome, with fine feelings, gifted with all the talents, and able to form an original judgment on all matters, he has always been my ideal and I could not rest till we became friends and I could experience pure joy in his ability and reputation. (cited in Ernest Jones, The Life and Work of Sigmund Freud, Volume I, VI.)

At the time Freud was studying the medical properties of cocaine, and was convinced that cocaine could be not only used as mild euphoriant, aphrodisiac and analgesic, but also as a treatment for morphine addicts. He recommended this to his friend Fleischl-Marxow, who proceeded to fall even deeper into the abyss of addiction. Devastated by pain, addiction, and disease, he relapsed and began using morphine again. Ernst von Fleischl-Marxow died on October 22, 1891, at 45 years of age. Freud wrote about him, without citing his name, in his analysis of Irma's injection in Interpretation of Dreams.

== Sources ==
- Borch-Jacobsen, Mikkel (2021). Freud's Patients: A Book of Lives. Reaktion Books, pp. 22-30. ISBN 978 1 78914 455 0
- Crews, Frederick (2017). Freud: The Making of an Illusion. New York: Metropolitan Books. ISBN 9781627797177
