= Therese Schlesinger =

Austrian politician

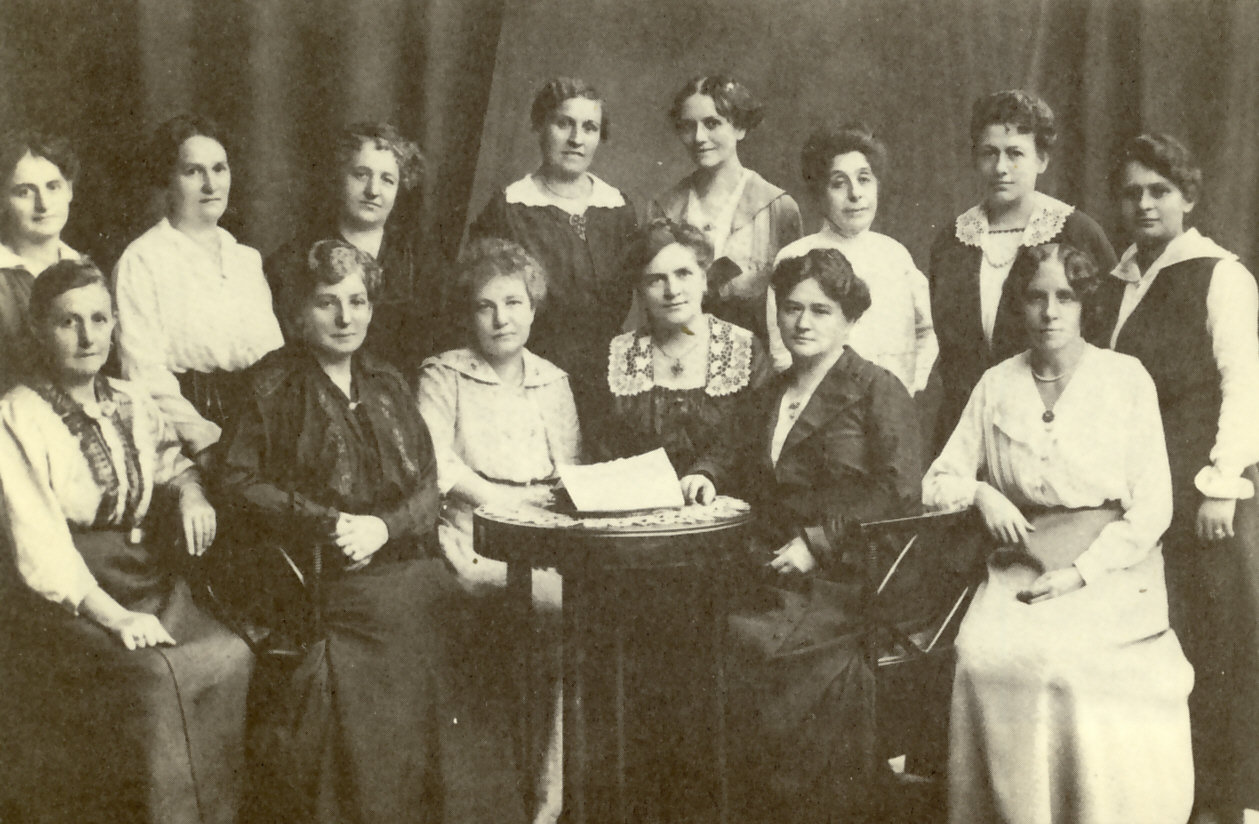
- Therese Schlesinger (lower row, third from left) at the Women's Reich Committee in 1917
- Born: Therese Eckstein; 6 June 1863; Vienna, Austrian Empire
- Died: 5 June 1940 (aged 76); Blois, France
- Occupations: Feminist, politician
- Spouse: Viktor Schlesinger
- Relatives: Emma Eckstein (sister); Friedrich Eckstein (brother); Gustav Eckstein (brother)

Therese Schlesinger (née Eckstein; 6 June 1863 – 5 June 1940) was an Austrian feminist and politician.

== Life ==
Therese Schlesinger was born in Vienna, capital of the Austrian Empire, on 6 June 1863 to an upper middle-class Jewish family. Among her siblings were the early psychologist Emma Eckstein, the writer Gustav Eckstein and the polymath Friedrich Eckstein. She married Viktor Schlesinger on 24 June 1888 and her daughter, Anna, was born a year later. The birth was very hard on Schlesinger with her right leg being partially disabled enough to force her into a wheelchair for several years. Her husband died on 23 January 1891. From 1905 she lived with her mother, daughter, sister Emma and brother Gustav until their deaths during the 1920s. Her daughter's suicide in 1920 profoundly effected Schlesinger. After the Anschluss with Nazi Germany in 1938, she fled to France. She spent the rest of her life in a sanatorium in Blois, where she died on 5 June 1940.

== Activities ==
Beginning in 1894, Schlesinger became involved in the Austrian feminist movement, joining the General Austrian Women's Association (German: Allgemeiner Österreichischer Frauenverein (AÖFV) and participated in the 1894 Enquéte on the Condition of Female Viennese Wage-Workers (German: Enquęte zur Lage der Wiener Lohnarbeiterinnen). At the end of 1897, she left the AÖFV and joined the Social Democratic Workers' Party of Austria (German: Sozialdemokratische Arbeiterpartei Österreichs. "In the years to follow, Schlesinger appeared at the center of debates over the best way to win women to the cause of Social Democracy. Her position was clear: the demands of trade union organizations did not extend to securing the political education of women and women’s voting rights, equally important demands as far as Schlesinger was concerned. Furthermore, if a new kind of solidarity were to be developed between people within the framework of a socialist project, it was first of all necessary to treat cultural questions pertaining to ‘everyday’ life and consciousness as political concerns." From 1919 to 1923, she served as a member of the National Council (German: Nationalrat). Later, she joined the Federal Council (German: Bundesrat), resigning on 5 December 1930.
