= The Interpretation of Dreams =

1899 book by Sigmund Freud

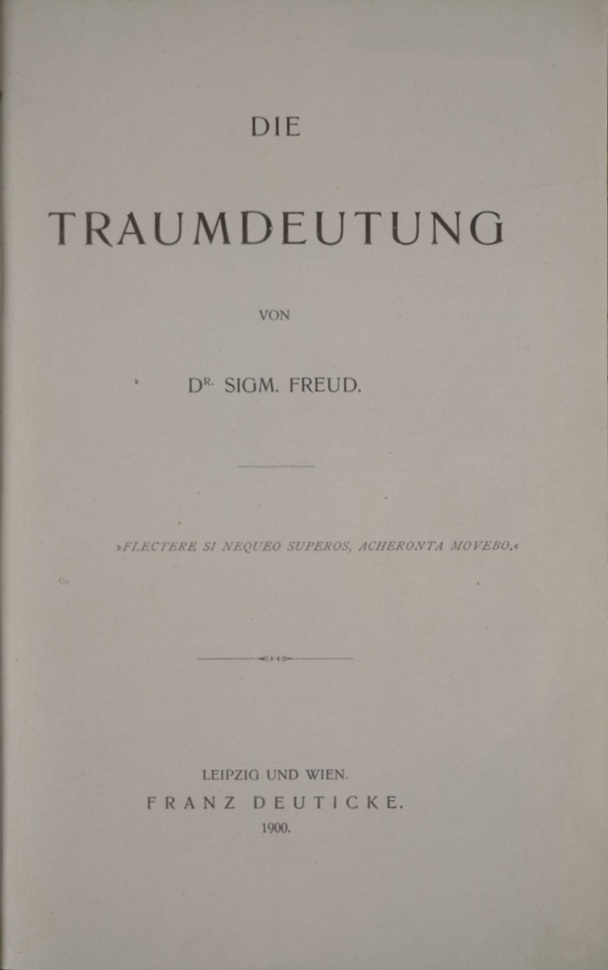
- Title page of the original German edition
- Author: Sigmund Freud
- Original title: Die Traumdeutung
- Translators: A. A. Brill (first version); James Strachey (authorized version); Joyce Crick (translation of first edition); J. A. Underwood (most recent translation)
- Language: German
- Subject: Dream interpretation
- Publisher: Franz Deuticke, Leipzig & Vienna
- Publication date: November 4, 1899 (dated 1900)
- Publication place: Austria
- English publication date: 1913 (Macmillan, translation of the German third edition)
- Media type: Print
- Text: The Interpretation of Dreams at Wikisource

The Interpretation of Dreams (German: Die Traumdeutung) is an 1899 book by Sigmund Freud, the founder of psychoanalysis, in which the author introduces his theory of the unconscious with respect to dream interpretation, and discusses what would later become the theory of the Oedipus complex. Freud revised the book at least eight times and, in the third edition, added an extensive section which treated dream symbolism very literally, following the influence of Wilhelm Stekel. Freud said of this work, "Insight such as this falls to one's lot but once in a lifetime."

Dated 1900, the book was first published in an edition of 600 copies, which did not sell out for eight years. The Interpretation of Dreams later gained in popularity, and seven more editions were published in Freud's lifetime.

Because of the book's length and complexity, Freud also wrote an abridged version called On Dreams. The original text is widely regarded as one of Freud's most significant works.

== Background ==
Freud spent the summer of 1895 at Schloss Bellevue near Grinzing in Austria, where he began the inception of The Interpretation of Dreams. In a 1900 letter to Wilhelm Fliess, he wrote in commemoration of the place:

Do you suppose that some day a marble tablet will be placed on the house, inscribed with these words: 'In this house on 24 July 1895, the secret of dreams was revealed to Dr. Sigm. Freud'? At the moment I see little prospect of it.

While staying at Schloss Bellevue, Freud dreamed his famous dream of 'Irma's injection'. He analyzed the dream as expressing an unconscious wish to be exonerated from his mishandling of the treatment of a patient in 1895. Schloss Bellevue was demolished in 1963, but a memorial plaque bearing Freud's imagined inscription has been erected at the site by the Vienna-based Sigmund Freud Society (Sigmund Freud Gesellschaft).

== Overview ==
Dreams, in Freud's view, are formed as the result of two mental processes. The first process involves unconscious forces that construct a wish that is expressed by the dream, and the second is the process of censorship that forcibly distorts the expression of the wish. In Freud's view, all dreams are forms of "wish fulfillment" (later in Beyond the Pleasure Principle, Freud would discuss dreams which do not appear to be wish-fulfillment). Freud states: "My presumption that dreams can be interpreted at once puts me in opposition to the ruling theory of dreams and in fact to every theory of dreams..."

Freud advanced the idea that an analyst can differentiate between the manifest content and latent content of a dream. The manifest content refers to the remembered narrative that plays out in the dream itself. The latent content refers to the underlying meaning of the dream. During sleep, the unconscious condenses, displaces, and forms representations of the dream content, the latent content of which is often unrecognizable to the individual upon waking.

Critics have argued that Freud's theory of dreams requires sexual interpretation. Freud, however, contested this criticism, noting that "the assertion that all dreams require a sexual interpretation, against which critics rage so incessantly, occurs nowhere in my Interpretation of Dreams. It is not to be found in any of the numerous editions of this book and is in obvious contradiction to other views expressed in it." Freud stated that "[T]he interpretation of dreams is the royal road to a knowledge of the unconscious activities of the mind."

=== Sources of dream content ===
Freud claimed that every dream has a connection point with an experience of the previous day. Though, the connection may be minor, as the dream content can be selected from any part of the dreamer's life. He described four possible sources of dreams: a) mentally significant experiences represented directly, b) several recent and significant experiences combined into a single unity by the dream, c) one or more recent and significant experiences which are represented in the content by the mention of a contemporary but indifferent experience, and d) an internal significant experience, such as a memory or train of thought, that is invariably represented in the dream by a mention of a recent but indifferent impression.

Oftentimes people experience external stimuli, such as an alarm clock or music, being distorted and incorporated into their dreams. Freud explained that this is because "the mind is withdrawn from the external world during sleep, and it is unable to give it a correct interpretation ..." He further explained that our mind wishes to continue sleeping, and therefore will try to suppress external stimuli, weave the stimuli into the dream, compel a person to wake up, or encourage them to overcome it.

Freud believed that dreams were picture-puzzles, and though they may appear nonsensical and worthless on the surface, through the process of interpretation they can form a "poetical phrase of the greatest beauty and significance."

==== Condensation, displacement, and representation in dreams ====
Dreams are brief compared to the range and abundance of dream thoughts. Through condensation or compression, dream content can be presented in one dream. Oftentimes, people may recall having more than one dream in a night. Freud explained that the content of all dreams occurring on the same night represents part of the same whole. He believed that separate dreams have the same meaning. Often the first dream is more distorted and the latter is more distinct. Displacement of dream content has occurred when manifest content does not resemble the actual meaning of the dream. Displacement comes through the influence of a censorship agent. Representation in dreams is the causal relation between two things. Freud argues that two persons or objects can be combined into a single representation in a dream (see Freud's dream of his uncle and Friend R).

=== On Dreams ===
An abridged version called On Dreams (Über den Traum) was published in 1901 as part of Löwenfeld and Kurella's Grenzfragen des Nerven und Seelenlebens. It was re-published in 1911 in slightly larger form as a book. On Dreams is also included in the 1953 edition and the second part of Freud's work on dreams, Volume Five of the Standard Edition, "The Interpretation of Dreams II and On Dreams." It follows chapter seven in The Interpretation of Dreams and in this edition, is fifty-three pages in length. There are thirteen chapters in total and Freud directs the reader to The Interpretation of Dreams for further reading throughout On Dreams, in particular, in the final chapter.

Immediately after its publication, Freud considered On Dreams to be a shortened version of The Interpretation of Dreams. The English translation of On Dreams was first published in 1914 and the second English publication in the James Strachey translation (Standard Edition) from 1953. Freud investigates the subject of displacement and our inability to recognize our dreams. In chapter VI, page 659, he states: "It is the process of displacement which is chiefly responsible for our being unable to discover or recognize them in the dream-content" and he considers the issue of displacement in chapter VIII, page 671 as: "the most striking of the dream-work."

On Dreams was translated into Russian in 1904, and it was the first work of Freud to be translated into another language.

== Contents ==
The first edition begins:

"In the following pages, I shall demonstrate that there exists a psychological technique by which dreams may be interpreted and that upon the application of this method every dream will show itself to be a senseful psychological structure which may be introduced into an assignable place in the psychic activity of the waking state. I shall furthermore endeavor to explain the processes which give rise to the strangeness and obscurity of the dream, and to discover through them the psychic forces, which operate whether in combination or opposition, to produce the dream. This accomplished by investigation will terminate as it will reach the point where the problem of the dream meets broader problems, the solution of which must be attempted through other material."

Freud begins his book in the first chapter titled "The Scientific Literature on the Problems of the Dream" by reviewing different scientific views on dream interpretation, which he finds interesting but not adequate. He then makes his argument by describing a number of dreams which he claims illustrate his theory.

Much of Freud's sources for analysis are in literature. Many of his most important dreams are his own — his method is inaugurated with an analysis of his dream "Irma's injection" — but many also come from patient case studies.

== Influence and reception ==
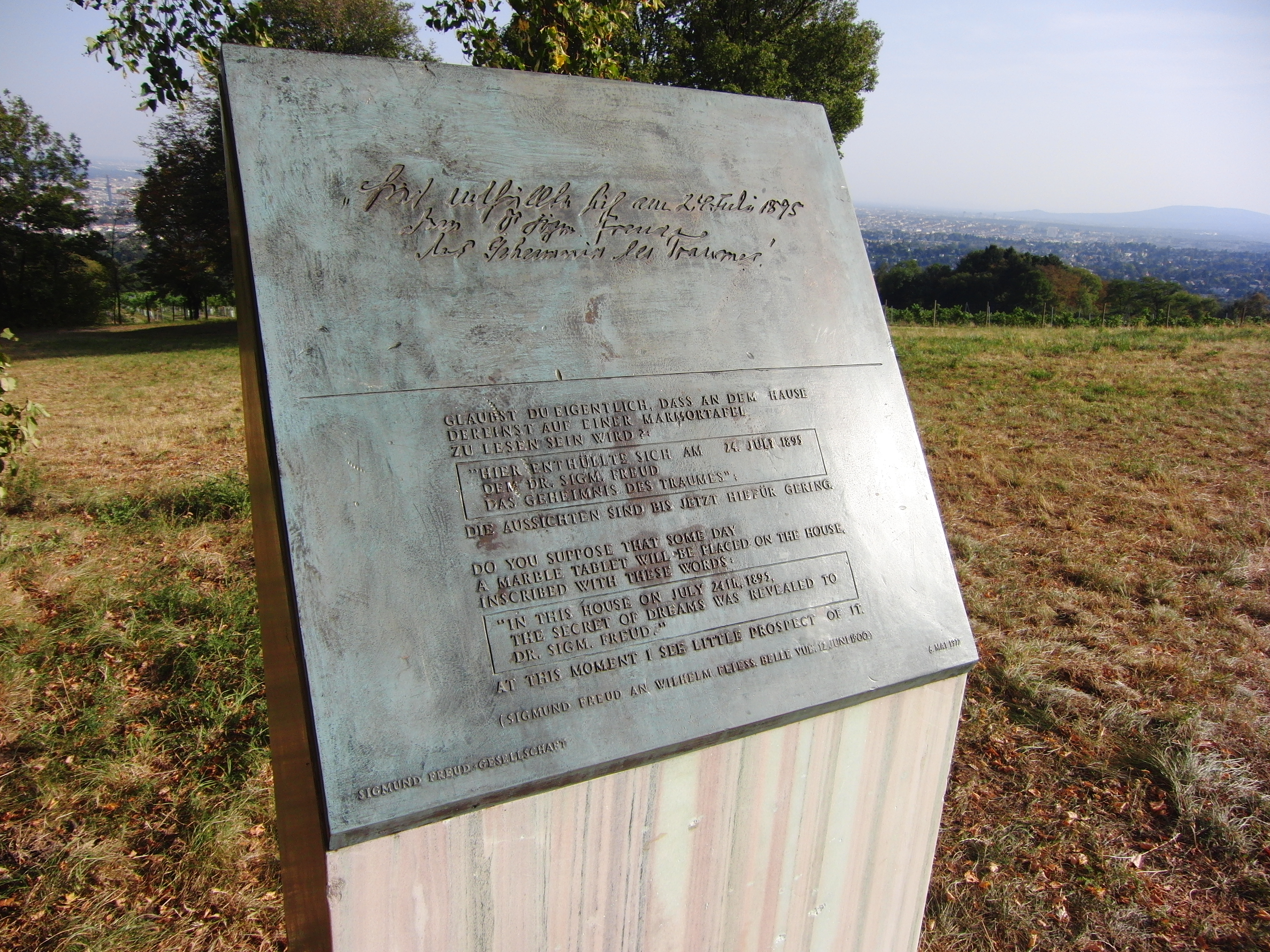
Memorial plate in commemoration of the place where Freud began The Interpretation of Dreams, near Grinzing, Austria

The Interpretation of Dreams was first published in an edition of only 600 copies, and these took eight years to sell. The work subsequently gained popularity, and seven more editions were printed in Freud's lifetime, the last in 1929.

The classicist Norman O. Brown described The Interpretation of Dreams as one of the great applications and extensions of the Socratic maxim "know thyself" in Life Against Death (1959). The philosopher Paul Ricœur described The Interpretation of Dreams as Freud's "first great book" in Freud and Philosophy (1965). He argued that like Freud's other works it posits a "semantics of desire". The mythologist Joseph Campbell described the book as an "epochal work", noting in The Masks of God: Creative Mythology (1968) that it was "based on insights derived from years devoted to the fantasies of neurotics". Max Schur, Freud's physician and friend, provided evidence in Freud: Living and Dying (1972) that the first dream that Freud analyzed, his so-called "Irma dream", was not very disguised, but actually closely portrayed a medical disaster of Emma Eckstein, one of Freud's patients. The psychologist Hans Eysenck argued in Decline and Fall of the Freudian Empire (1985) that the dreams Freud cites actually disprove Freud's dream theory.

The philosopher John Forrester described The Interpretation of Dreams as Freud's "masterpiece" in Dispatches from the Freud Wars (1997). He suggested that the book could be considered a form of autobiographical writing and compared it to the naturalist Charles Darwin's On the Origin of Species (1859). The philosopher Dermot Moran compared the influence that The Interpretation of Dreams exerted on psychoanalysis to that which the philosopher Edmund Husserl's Logical Investigations (1900–1901) exerted on 20th-century European philosophy in his introduction to the latter work.

The philosopher Mikkel Borch-Jacobsen and the psychologist Sonu Shamdasani noted in The Freud Files (2012) that the Swiss psychiatrist Eugen Bleuler wrote to Freud in October 1905 that he was convinced of the correctness of The Interpretation of Dreams as soon as he read it. They argued, however, that Freud's analysis of the dream of Irma's injection was partly based on Belgian psychologist Joseph Delboeuf's analysis of a dream in Sleep and Dreams. In their view, The Interpretation of Dreams should be placed in the context of the "introspective hypnotism" practiced by figures such as Auguste Forel, Eugen Bleuler, and Oskar Vogt. They charged Freud with selectively citing some authors on dreams (including Marie-Jean-Léon, Marquis d'Hervey de Saint Denys and Louis Ferdinand Alfred Maury), ignoring others (including Jean-Martin Charcot, Pierre Janet, and Richard von Krafft-Ebing), and systematically avoiding "citing the passages in the works of his predecessors which came closest to his own theories."

E. James Lieberman and Robert Kramer wrote in an introduction to a collection of letters between Freud and the psychoanalyst Otto Rank that Rank was impressed by The Interpretation of Dreams when he read it in 1905, and was moved to write a critical reanalysis of one of Freud's own dreams. They suggested that it may have been partly this reanalysis that brought Rank to Freud's attention. They noted that it was with Rank's help that Freud published the second edition of The Interpretation of Dreams in 1909. Art historian and filmmaker Joseph Koerner drew the title of his 2019 film The Burning Child from a dream of that title, which opens Chapter 7 of Interpretation of Dreams. The album packaging for the 2002 David Bowie album 'Heathen' contains an image of the book.

== Translations ==
The first authorized translation from German into English was completed by one of Freud's earliest followers and translators, A. A. Brill, in 1913, and then in a second revised edition in 1915. This translation was of the 3rd German (1911) edition of Freud's book. In 1932, a third, "completely revised" edition of Brill's translation, now translated from the 8th German edition (1930), also appeared in 1932, and included a new short preface by Freud, but it is unknown who authored these revisions. Although Brill's translations are generally considered to be inferior to the later ones completed by James Strachey, editors of a revised translation of Brill's 1915 edition remark that Brill's translation is somewhat less flawed "than one might think", and that his sometimes extensive footnotes are of historical interest.

James Strachey's authorized, variorum translation of the 8th German edition appeared in 1953 as volumes four and five of the Standard Edition. With slight amendments, his translation is also included in the Revised Standard Edition of 2024 (similarly in volumes 4 and 5).

In 1999, Joyce Crick's translation of the first German edition (1900) was published by Oxford University Press; Crick was awarded the Schlegel-Tieck translation prize for it. The most recent English translation, by J. A. Underwood, is titled Interpreting Dreams and was published in 2006. Underwood's translation, which unlike Strachey's is not a critical edition, was published as a part of Penguin's New Penguin Freud series edited by Adam Phillips.
