= Psychic energy =

Psychic energy may refer to:

- Energy (esotericism), spiritual energy
- Energy (psychological), mental energy
