= Irma's injection =

Dream analysed by Sigmund Freud

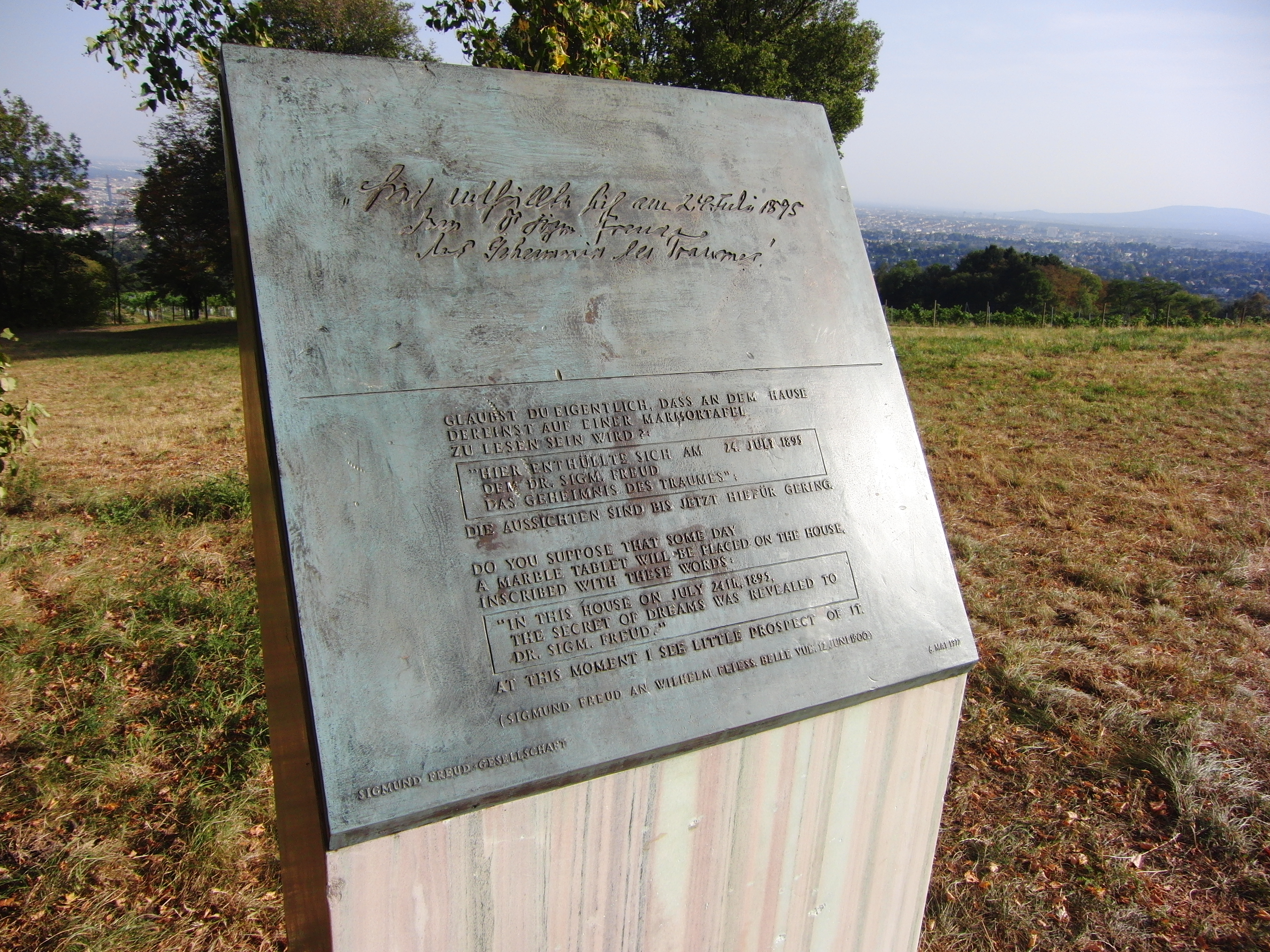
Sigmund Freud-Stele on Cobenzl in Vienna. Text: "Do you suppose that some day a marble tablet will be placed on the house, inscribed with these words: "In this house on July 24th, 1895, the secret of dreams was revealed to Dr. Sigm. Freud." At this moment I see little prospect on it." (Sigmund Freud an Wilhelm Fließ. Belle Vue. 12. Juni 1900). Sigmund Freud-Gesellschaft 6. Mai 1977

"Irma's injection" is the name given to the dream that Sigmund Freud dreamt on the night of July 23, 1895, and that he subsequently analyzed to arrive at his theory that dreams are wish fulfillments. He described his ideas on dream theory and provided his analysis of the dream, alongside other dreams from case studies, in his book The Interpretation of Dreams.

Freud later noted that "Irma's injection" was the first dream he had devoted a meticulous level of interpretation to. Although he spent much time analyzing it, he confessed that his interpretation had gaps and did not completely uncover the meaning of his dream.

== The dream ==
Freud had been treating a patient, whom he called Irma, during the summer of 1895. At one point he proposed a particular treatment solution that Irma was not willing to accept. Irma’s treatment was partially successful, but it ended before it was complete. After some time had passed, Freud visited with a colleague who knew Irma and asked about her condition. Freud was informed that Irma was "better, but not quite well." That night, Freud dreamt the dream that is now known as "Irma’s Injection". He described it as follows:

A large hall - numerous guests, whom we were receiving. - Among them was Irma. I at once took her to one side, as though to answer her letter and to reproach her for not having accepted my 'solution' yet. I said to her: 'If you still get pains, it's really only your fault.' She replies: 'If you only knew what pains I've got now in my throat and stomach and abdomen - it's choking me.' - I was alarmed and looked at her. She looked pale and puffy. I thought to myself that after all I must be missing some organic trouble. I took her to the window and looked down her throat, and she showed signs of recalcitrance, like women with artificial dentures. I thought to myself that there was really no need for her to do that. She then opened her mouth properly and on the right I found a big white patch; at another place I saw extensive whitish grey scabs upon some remarkable curly structures which were evidently modelled on the turbinal bones of the nose. - I at once called in Dr M., and he repeated the examination and confirmed it ... Dr M. looked quite different from usual; he was very pale, he walked with a limp and his chin was clean-shaven ... My friend Otto was now standing beside her as well, and my friend Leopold was percussing her through her bodice and saying: 'She has a dull area low down on the left.' He also indicated that a portion of the skin on her left shoulder was infiltrated. (I noticed this, just as he did, in spite of her dress.) ... M. said: 'There's no doubt it's an infection, but no matter; dysentery will supervene and the toxin will be eliminated. ... We were directly aware, too, of the origin of the infection. Not long before, when she was feeling unwell, my friend Otto had given her an injection of a preparation of propyl, propyls ... propionic acid ... trimethylamine (and I saw before me the formula for this printed in heavy type) ... Injections of this sort ought not to be given so thoughtlessly ... And probably the syringe had not been clean.

== Freud’s analysis of the dream ==
Freud wrote down his dream immediately once he awoke. He felt that this dream had an advantage over others because it was clear that the events from the previous day had provided a starting point for the dream. Freud analyzed every aspect of the dream in great detail. In his analysis of "Irma’s Injection", Freud substituted many of the individuals in his real life for the people in the dream, including patients, family members, and friends. He thought about the medical mistakes he had made and believed that he was unconsciously seeking to rid himself of the guilt caused by them.

The dream starts with the hall at Bellevue, where Freud and his wife were staying for the summer. In the upcoming days they were to host a party for his wife’s birthday. Freud was informed of the guests and remembers his patient being among them. This patient serves as Irma in the dream, who is still suffering from pains. Freud informed Irma that her suffering was her own fault for not accepting his diagnosis. Irma complained of pains in her stomach and the feeling of being choked by them. This led Freud to question his diagnosis, and he sought to find a possible error to avoid blame for the lack of presenting a cure. Freud proceeds to re-examine Irma and inspects her oral cavity. Freud stated in his analysis that Irma’s actions at this point in the dream reminded him of a female friend of Irma’s. He thought of a few explanations as to why he replaced Irma with someone else in the dream. These explanations included the idea that he did not want Irma as a patient or the fact that he held Irma’s friend in high regard for her intelligence. Freud also considered Irma to be irrational for not taking his offered solution to her problem. He believed that Irma’s friend would have been wiser and would have agreed to Freud’s proposed solution.

When Freud looked in Irma’s throat he saw a white scab on the turbinal bone. In his analysis he stated that these particular signs in the dream reminded him of his daughter’s illness and the difficulties his family went through at that time. At one point when Freud was using cocaine frequently to counter an ailment, he learned that a dear friend of his (Ernst von Fleischl-Marxow) had died because of the misuse of the cocaine treatment. He confessed of having "been the first to recommend the use of cocaine in 1885, and this recommendation had brought serious reproaches down on me". Freud believed that the scab in the dream was an indicator of the concern he had had with his own health at the time. In the dream, Freud asks Dr. M. for a second opinion. Once again, Freud recalled a past medical mistake during his analysis. He was reminded of a patient whom he unknowingly prescribed a toxic drug. The patient became ill, and Freud was forced to ask his more experienced colleague for help. Freud also recalled that this patient had the same name as his daughter, Mathilde. Freud analyzed that it seemed he was using the dream as an opportunity to criticize himself for the medical mistakes he had made.

In the dream, Dr. M. assures Freud that Irma’s symptoms point to an infection and that her body will rid itself of the effects. Freud believed that this fact allowed him to shift the blame for Irma’s illness because his treatment could not have caused such an infection. He was relieved in knowing that Dr. M. supported him and that this was not his fault.

== Freud's dream theory ==
Freud came to a conclusion about the meaning and intention of the dream using his analysis. He believed that the dream fulfilled several wishes and that it represented a particular situation that he might have wished to exist in. Freud concluded that the motive of the dream was a wish and the content of the dream was a wish fulfillment.

Freud eventually concluded that all dreams represent some sort of wish fulfillment. He analyzed his patients' dreams as well as his own using free-association and found that in nearly every case, the latent content included wishes, even if the manifest content seemed to be the opposite of a wish fulfillment. Freud believed that every dream contained manifest and latent content. He believed that the manifest content was the consciously experienced aspect of the dream, while the latent content was the hidden inspiration of the dream that could only be remembered after free-association. Freud concluded that in cases where only the latent content of the dream contained a wish, the manifest content was helping to hide the embarrassing aspects of the latent content.

== Other interpretations ==
Since its publication, the dream of Irma's injection "has received more attention than any other dream in the history of psychoanalysis". Numerous interpretations of the dream have been proposed, often with reference to what is known of its real-world context. For example, it has been suggested that aspects of the dream reflect Freud's concerns about his own health problems, his wife's pregnancy, or the process of developing his new psychoanalytical techniques. The dream has also been seen as an expression of Freud's suppressed sexual desires.

Max Schur, Freud's friend and physician, argued that the dream was heavily influenced by an incident involving one of Freud's patients, Emma Eckstein. Two months prior to the dream, Freud had referred Eckstein to Wilhelm Fliess for nasal surgery, the consequences of which were almost fatal for Eckstein and left her permanently disfigured. Schur believed that Freud's dream represented an attempt to shift the blame for this situation onto Eckstein, and thus absolve both Fliess and himself from responsibility.

However, the real person whom Freud conceals behind the name of "Irma" is probably not Emma Eckstein; it is more likely to be a family friend of his, Anna Lichtheim.

== See also ==
- Rat man
- Sergei Pankejeff (The "Wolf Man")
