= Henry Koerner House =

- U.S. National Register of Historic Places
- Location within Pittsburgh Location within Pennsylvania Location within the United States
- Location: 1055 South Negley Ave.
- Coordinates: 40°26′54″N 79°55′43″W
- Built: 1966
- Architect: Richard Righter
- NRHP reference No.: 100008534
- Added to NRHP: January 12, 2023

The Henry Koerner House is the historic home of Austrian-American artist Henry Koerner, located in the Squirrel Hill neighborhood of Pittsburgh, Pennsylvania. The house was built in 1966 and served as Koerner's residence, studio, and gallery until his death in 1991. It was designated a Historic Landmark by the Pittsburgh History and Landmarks Foundation in 2021 and was added to the National Register of Historic Places in 2023.

The house is a three-story brick building with a mansard roof. The design was influenced by Koerner's memories of growing up in Vienna and by his idiosyncratic tastes, such as a preference for vertical, preferably floor-to-ceiling windows in the style of nineteenth-century apartments in Paris and Vienna. The front elevation of the Koerner House has an off-center arched doorway on the ground floor, three tall windows with Juliet balconies on the second floor, and seven floor-to-ceiling windows and two dormers on the third floor. The front door contains a large stained glass window, created by Koerner, depicting a mother and daughter in bikinis embracing. A patio on the side of the house is surrounded by a low brick wall decorated with ten putti. The interior of the house contains Koerner's studio and gallery on the first floor, living, dining, and kitchen areas on the second floor, and three bedrooms on the third floor.

All rooms of the house, all minimally furnished, were used as flexible exhibition spaces, with state-of-the-art gallery lighting.
