= The Burning Child =

2019 American-Austrian documentary film

- Poster
- Directed by: Joseph Leo Koerner, Christian D. Bruun
- Written by: Joseph Leo Koerner
- Produced by: Joseph Leo Koerner; Christian D. Bruun; Bo-Mi Choi
- Narrated by: Joseph Leo Koerner and Adam Phillips
- Cinematography: Christian D. Bruun
- Edited by: Sabine Krayenbühl
- Music by: Anthony Cheung
- Distributed by: 7th Arts Releasing and Amazon Prime Videos
- Release dates: 31 January 2019 (Harvard Art Museums); 30 March 2019
- Running time: 113 minutes
- Languages: English, German

The Burning Child is a 2019 feature documentary film directed by Joseph Leo Koerner and Christian D. Bruun. Created by Harvard art historian Joseph Koerner, the film explores Viennese architectural Modernism through the story of Koerner's father, painter Henry Koerner, who escaped Vienna after Adolf Hitler's annexation of Austria. Part documentary, part personal narrative, part dream sequence, the film explores themes of home, landscape, memory, trauma, repetition, and exile. The film began streaming on Amazon Prime in 2022. A new German version of the film, titled Wohnungswanderung,is underway. A director's cut was screen May 7, 2024 as the inaugural film presentation at the newly expanded Wien Museum.

== Synopsis ==
A painting haunts Joseph Koerner. It shows his grandparents before they vanished in the Holocaust. The film follows Joseph's return to Vienna to solve the riddle of their disappearance.

== About ==
The film follows Joseph Koerner as he investigates the fate of his grandparents and their Viennese home – known only through a painting by his exiled father. Made in 1944, the painting lovingly details the grandparents’ apartment, the private sanctuary from which they were taken and from which their son— artist Henry Koerner, Joseph's father and the painting's creator—barely escaped in 1938. With his father's painting as his guide, Joseph visits historians, archivists, architects, and artists who conjure Vienna's passion for homemaking—the apartments, bars, galleries, and sanatoria that are the triumphs of modern interior design. He enters interiors created by Otto Wagner, Gustav Klimt, Josef Hoffmann, Adolf Loos, Sigmund Freud and others that bring to light dark recesses of the soul.

Joseph's journey also passes through a maze of state and municipal archives, where Joseph uncovers the history of his grandparents’ home after the catastrophe brought about by the Anschluss—Hitler's annexation of Austria and the systematic destruction of the homes and families of Viennese Jews, who sought safe haven in the city after centuries of persecution. Joseph also enters the workshop of a master shoemaker, heir to an establishment boasting the "imperial and royal" Habsburg patent that made shoes for the nobility. The present shoemaker's family history is one of multi-generational belonging to Vienna, though haunted by the past, including fate of a Jewish tailor in the same building. His story plays off against Joseph's. The film discovers Joseph receiving repaired shoes back from this shoemaker, who describes his products as interiors that wearers carry with them.

Completed eighty years after the Anschluss, the film unfolds through thirteen chapters, called "Stellen" (German for "stations"), that move through Vienna's urban and psychic interior to a buried past, when dreams of home became, for a city's most ardent homemakers, an unimaginable nightmare. The word "Stellen" references Otto Wagner's theory of infrastructural transit nodes that characterize belonging in the modern metropolis as necessarily in motion. The film's interviews are set in representative interiors that are simultaneously closed off from the city and invaded by movement in the form of subterranean waters, subways, tunnels, back entrances, etc. Movement between these interiors is disorienting, as in a dream. Towards the end, the film reveals that its locations and the camera's point of view repeat paintings painted by Joseph's father, which were themselves repetitions of the grandparent's walks. The shoemaker, a water scientist, and the expert interviewees are cast as characters in an unfolding sequence of accidental and fated tableaux. The past is repeated rather than recovered.

== Plot ==
Entering Vienna in aerial shots and by train in the morning from the west, with the flow of the Danube River, Joseph visits the Imperial Pavilion, a station at Hietzing of the Vienna Stadtbahn designed by Otto Wagner to take the Emperor by train from his summer residence Schönbrunn Palace to the Hofburg and his offices in center city. A famous interior designed by Wagner, the Pavilion, straddling the tracks of the Stadtbahn, supposes Franz Joseph I of Austria to be a busy, nervous commuter needing to be comforted by nature imagery and directed by modern architectural signage and design. The film transitions to Freud's home and offices at Berggasse 19, where we learn about Freud's home-making efforts and the peculiar space he created for patients: the psychoanalytical consultation room as utopian domestic setting that projects patients back to family and home. We learn about Freud's flight from Vienna in 1938 and the fate of his apartment at Berggasse 19—it became a collective apartment for Jews to be sent to the death camps. Wagner's Stadtbahn carries Joseph to the exposed bed of the Wien (river) where he encounters water ecologist Stefan Schmutz releasing baby sturgeons. Sturgeons, Schmutz explains, are born with a homing instinct: they return to spawn where they were born. Flowing underground the river takes Joseph to the Vienna Secession, where Vienna's foremost artists and architects (Olbrich, Klimt, Hoffmann, Koloman Moser and others) imagined futuristic dream homes for their largely Jewish clientele. Speaking before Klimt's Beethoven Frieze, artist and theorist Peter Weibel explains Freud's theory of the Uncanny, where home is familiar and strange, built architecture and psychic space. The story of interior design, as an artistic and psychic process, passes to Josef Hoffmann's modernist Sanatorium Purkersdorf, Adolf Loos' American Bar and Looshaus on Michaelerplatz, artist Bernhard Leitner's sound-art studio in Upper Austria, and shoemaker Rudolf Scheer & Sons, to the archives at the heart of Vienna. There Joseph learns of the facts of his grandparents murder upon their arrival by train to the Maly Trostinets extermination camp. Joseph walks to the site of his father's disappeared Viennese home. To the sound of a late 1920s recording of an old-fashioned aria from Erich Wolfgang Korngold's "Die tote Stadt," a montage of photographs taken by his father in Vienna in 1946 gives way to a full view of the painting and the lost home it depicts.

The film ends with an extended coda. Joseph visits an elderly holocaust survivor, Edith Brickell, whose parents also died at Maly Trostinets. Able to reclaim her Vienna apartment after the war, she reports that dreams she had of her parents surviving ceased after she moved back into that apartment. The film ends on an abandoned beach at the eastern outskirts of Vienna, where the Danube departs from the city. Joseph chances on an centenarian bather who at first dimly remembers Henry Koerner, then recovers precise memories of him. A refugee from communist Yugoslavia, the old man declares the beach to be his ersatz home. Children replace the bather and his memories, the Danube is shown flowing from the Prater Spitz eastward into Hungary, and a closing aerial shot glimpses Vienna coming into view again from the west, with the voice of Adam Phillips reflecting on secret spaces of home.

== Title ==
The phrase "The Burning Child" comes from a story told by Freud in The Interpretation of Dreams. The story involves the waking situation of a child’s corpse accidentally catching on fire while the exhausted father, asleep in a room next door, dreams the child stands by his bed, catches him by the arm, “and whisper[s] reproachfully, ‘Father, don’t you see I’m burning.’” In the film, Freud's words (unidentified) are read in voiceover by Adam Phillips, first, in part, as the title sequence of the film, then, in full, after the interview with survivor Edith Brickell. Set implicitly in a Jewish home, the dream story concerns relations between sleep and waking life, and between generations divided by trauma.

== Production ==
The Burning Child was filmed on location in and around Vienna, except for scenes filmed at the Freud Museum in London and in the consultation room of British psychologist Adam Phillips. Notable locations in Vienna include Sigmund Freud's home in Berggasse 19, Aggstein Castle ruins in Wachau, Otto Wagner's Hofpavillon in Hietzing, The American Bar by architect Adolph Loos, The Secession Building by architect Joseph Maria Olbrich, Sanatorium Purkersdorf by architect Josef Hoffmann. During production, Joseph Koerner was cast as the character Joseph K., named after Franz Kafka's anti-hero, a name given to Joseph Koerner by his teacher, literary critic Frank Kermode.The film's Viennese locations repeat scenes painted by Henry Koerner.

The film was funded by the Andrew W. Mellon Foundation on the basis of the Mellon Distinguished Achievement Award, received by Joseph Koerner in 2009. Koerner presented the historical background to the film in his 2012 Tanner Lectures on Human Values at Cambridge University and 2013 Slade Lectures at Oxford University. In 2018, a 126 minute directors' cut of the film was previewed at Harvard University, the Berkeley Art Museum and Pacific Film Archive, Yale University Art Gallery, and at the Burgkino in Vienna. Since then the final cut has had director's screenings at the Metropolitan Museum of Art, the Neue Galerie, the Whitney Museum of American Art, the New York University Tisch School of the Arts, the Film Forum at Princeton University, and in a special 2022 screening in Pittsburgh celebrating Henry Koerner's life and art. It was an official selection of the 2019 Jerusalem Jewish Film Festival and the 2020 JFilm Festival.

Original music by Anthony Cheung evokes the atonalism of the Second Viennese School while also referencing specific motifs from the wider soundtrack that includes modern, historical, and personal recordings of works by Vienna-based composers, including Wolfgang Amadeus Mozart, Ludwig van Beethoven, Franz Schubert, Gustav Mahler, Arnold Schoenberg and Korngold.

== Technical ==
Filming started in 2013. The film was shot by Director of Photography Christian D. Bruun in 4K resolution Sony RAW video in wide format 2.35 aspect ratio. Using the Sony NEX-FS700 camera with a 4K upgrade and recording to the Sony AXS-R5 RAW format recorder module, the film is an early example of a film that was shot and finalized in 4K HDR exhibition format DCP at Technicolor in Hollywood, Los Angeles.

== Release ==
The English version of film was released in 2019 and has been streaming on Amazon Prime Video since September 2022. In the Fall 2018 issue of October (No. 166) German art historian Benjamin Buchloh published an extensive interview in conversation with Joseph Leo Koerner about the film. Since the release, Koerner published in Granta an account of the film in light of his subsequent 2019 visit to Maly Trostinets. Koerner's essay was anthologized in The Best American Essays 2020. Koerner is working on a book-form companion to the film titled Vienna Interior.

The German version of the film, with new voices, takes its title from Adolf Loos's 1907 pamphlet Wohnungswanderungendescribing his (Loos's) paid tours to apartments he had helped design.
