= Energy (psychological) =

Concept in some psychological theories

In psychology, energy is a hypothesised force or dynamic underlying mental processes under several theoretical frameworks. The idea has roots in classical philosophy and was developed in the late nineteenth and early twentieth centuries within psychoanalysis, particularly by Sigmund Freud and Carl Jung, who used it to explain motivation, instinct, and the structure of the psyche. In later psychology and neuroscience, mental energy has sometimes been compared metaphorically to physical energy or associated with brain metabolism, though the concept has been criticized for lacking clear empirical or neurological correlates. Related notions also appear in contemporary approaches such as energy psychology, whose theoretical claims and reported empirical findings remain the subject of debate.

== Philosophical accounts ==
The idea harks back to Aristotle's conception of actus et potentia. In the philosophical context, the term "energy" may have the literal meaning of "activity" or "operation". Henry More, in his 1642 Psychodia platonica; or a platonic song of the soul, defined an "energy of the soul" as including "every phantasm of the soul". In 1944 Julian Sorell Huxley characterised "mental energy" as "the driving forces of the psyche, emotional as well as intellectual [...]."

== Psychoanalytic accounts ==
In 1874, the concept of "psychodynamics" was proposed with the publication of Lectures on Physiology by German physiologist Ernst Wilhelm von Brücke who, in coordination with physicist Hermann von Helmholtz, one of the formulators of the first law of thermodynamics (conservation of energy), supposed that all living organisms are energy-systems also governed by this principle. During this year, at the University of Vienna, Brücke served as supervisor for first-year medical student Sigmund Freud who adopted this new "dynamic" physiology. In his Lectures on Physiology, Brücke set forth the then-radical view that the living organism is a dynamic system to which the laws of chemistry and physics apply.

In The Ego and the Id, Freud argued that the id was the source of the personality's desires, and therefore of the psychic energy that powered the mind. Freud defined libido as the instinct energy or force. Freud later added the death drive (also contained in the id) as a second source of mental energy. The origins of Freud's basic model, based on the fundamentals of chemistry and physics, according to John Bowlby, stems from Brücke, Meynert, Breuer, Helmholtz, and Herbart.

In 1928, Carl Jung published a seminal essay entitled "On Psychic Energy" which dealt with energy Jung claimed was first discovered by Russian philosopher Nikolaus Grot. Later, the theory of psychodynamics and the concept of "psychic energy" was developed further by those such as Alfred Adler and Melanie Klein.

A pupil of Freud named Wilhelm Reich proponed a theory construed out of the root of Freud's libido, of psychic energy he came to term orgone energy. This was very controversial and Reich was soon rejected and expelled from the Vienna Psychoanalytical Association.

Psychological energy and force are the basis of an attempt to formulate a scientific theory according to which psychological phenomena would be subject to precise laws akin to how physical objects are subject to Newton's laws. This concept of psychological energy is separate and distinct from (or even opposed to) the mystical eastern concept of spiritual energy.

The Myers–Briggs Type Indicator divides people into 16 categories based on whether certain activities leave them feeling energized or drained of energy.

== Neuroscientific accounts ==
Mental energy has been repeatedly compared to, or connected with, the physical quantity energy.

Studies of the 1990s to 2000s (and earlier) have found that mental effort can be measured in terms of increased metabolism in the brain. The modern neuroscientific view is that brain metabolism, measured by functional magnetic resonance imaging or positron emission tomography, is a physical correlate of mental activity.

== Criticism ==
The concept of psychic energy has been criticized because it lacks empirical evidence and there is not a neurological or neuropsychological correlate, unlike with the neural correlates of consciousness.

Shevrin argues that energy may be a systems concept. He theorizes that the strength of an emotion can remain the same, while an emotion changes. He argues that this intensity, can be understood separately from emotion and that this intensity might be considered energy.

However, a significant volume of empirical research on energy psychology has emerged over several decades, much of it published in peer-reviewed medical and psychology journals. It includes a large body of randomized controlled trials; extensive noteworthy uncontrolled trials in which subjects served as their own controls, with measurements taken over time to assess client progress; as well as small pilot studies and collections of case histories that are suggestive of future research directions.

Thus, as of the date of this citation, there have been over 200 review articles, research studies, and meta-analyses published in professional peer-reviewed journals. This includes over 70 randomized controlled trials, 50 clinical outcomes studies, 5 meta-analyses, 4 systematic reviews of various energy psychology modalities, and 9 comparative reviews of energy psychology with other therapies such as EMDR and cognitive behavioral therapy. All but one of the experimental studies have documented the effectiveness of energy psychology modalities. Also, the studies document the efficacy of energy psychology methods for the treatment of physical pain, anxiety, depression, cravings, trauma, PTSD, and peak athletic performance.

Concerning meta-analyses, four revealed a large effect size and one a moderate effect size. The Gilomen & Lee (2015) meta-analysis indicated a moderate effect size of tapping on psychological distress (utilizing Hedge's g as compared to the standard Cohen's h), although they opined that the results could be due to factors common to other therapeutic approaches, and not necessarily due to tapping. Nelms & Castel (2016) found a large effect size on tapping for depression, Clond's (2017) revealed a large effect size for treating anxiety, and Sebastian & Nelms (2017) also indicated a large effect size for PTSD. Regarding the question of acupoint tapping as an active therapeutic ingredient, the meta-analysis by Church, Stapleton, Kip & Gallo (2020) revealed a large effect size in this regard, supporting tapping as an active therapeutic ingredient.

== See also ==
- Cathexis
- Cognitive load
- Death drive
- Energy (esotericism)
- Energy psychology
- Humorism
- Id, ego and superego
- Libido
- Mental energy
- Mind
- Motivation
- Psyche (psychology)
- Spoon theory
- Theory of mind
