= Henry Koerner =

Austrian-American painter (1915–1991)

- Born: August 28, 1915; Vienna, Austria
- Died: 4 July 1991 (aged 75); St. Pölten, Austria
- Spouses: Fritzi Apfel (m. 1940) Joan Marlene Frasher (m. 1953)
- Children: Joseph Leo Koerner; Stephanie Beth Koerner

Henry Koerner (born Heinrich Sieghart Körner; August 28, 1915 – July 4, 1991) was an Austrian-born American painter and graphic designer best known for his early Magical Realist works of the late 1940s and his portrait covers for Time magazine.

== Early life ==
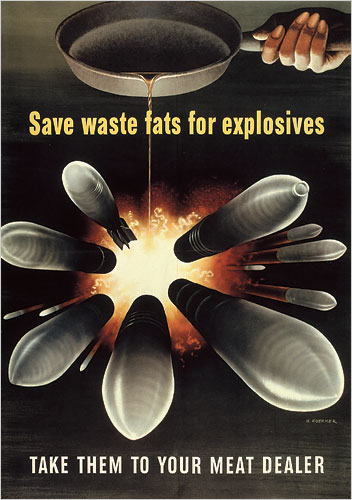
Save Waste Fats for Explosives by Henry Koerner, 1943, for the Office of War Information

Born in the Leopoldstadt District of Vienna to non-observant Jewish parents Leo Körner (1879–1942) and Feige ("Fanny") Dwora Körner née Mager (1887–1942), Koerner attended the Realgymnasium Vereinsgasse. His aunt on his father's side, was the painter and printmaker Sophie Körner (later Sophie Figdor). Studying graphic design at Vienna's Graphische Lehr- und Versuchsanstalt (1934–36), Henry Cover worked in the studio of Viktor Theodor Slama, designing posters and book jackets. Following Hitler's annexation of Austria in 1938, he escaped (by air September 16) to Italy (Venice and Milan), in 1939 to the United States, settling in New York. In 1940 he married Viennese-born Fritzi Apfel.

Employed as a commercial artist in Maxwell Bauer Studios in Manhattan, he achieved initial success as a poster artist, receiving first prize from the American Society of the Control of Cancer Poster Competition and two first prizes from the National War Poster Competition. In 1943, the Office of War Information hired Koerner in its Graphics Division in New York, where he worked alongside artists Ben Shahn, Bernard Perlin, and David Stone Martin. Shahn's pictorial style, along with the photography of Walker Evans and German Neue Sachlichkeit painters (e.g., Otto Dix), inspired Koerner's painting, which began with a rendering of his family home in Vienna (My Parents I, 1944).

Drafted into the U.S. Army, he was ordered in 1944 to the Graphics Division of the Office of Strategic Services in Washington, D.C., where he made war posters, including Save Waste Fats and Someone Talked, the latter winning an award from the Museum of Modern Art. Shipped to London, he documented, in pen and ink sketches and photographs, everyday life during wartime. After VE Day (8 May 1945), Koerner was reassigned to Germany, working in Wiesbaden and Berlin, and sketching defendants at the Nuremberg trials.

== Magical realism ==
Discharged from the army in 1946, Koerner returned to Vienna to ascertain that his parents, his brother Kurt (b. 1913) and sister-in-law (Olga Körner, b. 1920), his seven aunts and uncles, and all but two of his cousins, had been deported and killed. Later research revealed that his parents had been murdered upon arrival at June 15, 1942 at Maly Trostenets, outside Minsk. Photographs taken by the artist during his April 1946 return to Vienna exhibited were exhibited posthumously in exhibitions in Vienna, Naples, Florida and Columbus, Ohio.

In Berlin, having joined on March 27, 1946 the Graphics Division of the U.S. Military Government, he painted his first major works, including My Parents II (Curtis Galleries, Inc., Minneapolis), The Skin of Our Teeth (Sheldon Memorial Art Gallery, University of Nebraska), and Mirror of Life (Whitney Museum of American Art, New York). These paintings were exhibited in 1947, to international acclaim, in a one-person show at Berlin's Haus am Waldsee—the first exhibition of American modern art in post-war Germany and the first and for many years the only art exhibition in Germany to reflect on the holocaust. Auschwitz had been liberated less than two years earlier, and a generation later artists would base their undertaking on the exploration of problems of historical trauma, memory, and amnesia, American art critics complained of what they perceived as Koerner's unwarranted "bitterness" and "hysterical I-told-you-so path," advising him to look forward, not back.

Returning to New York later that year, Koerner exhibited the Berlin works in an exhibition at Midtown Galleries, which represented him until 1964. Life magazine wrote of the show: "No new artist in years has been accorded the sudden, unanimous praise received by Koerner." Critics associated his work that of other so-called Magic, (or Symbolic) Realists such as Paul Cadmus and George Tooker. Koerner's art was admired by Lincoln Kirstein, who exhibited several of the artist's paintings in the show Symbolic Realism in American Painting, 1940-1950 at the London Institute of Contemporary Arts, organized to coincide with performances by the New York City Ballet in London.

Inspired by the structural logic of Giotto's frescoes in the Arena Chapel, Koerner created in 1948–49 a new series of paintings—all in the same scale and viewpoint and focused on the American scene—that absorbed fantastical elements into the fabric of everyday life. The artist took some inspiration from the handcrafted, vernacular surrealism of Coney Island ghost rides and fun houses, which he painted as uncanny conduits to the Prater amusement park of his childhood home in Leopoldstadt. In 1949 Koerner work received the Temple Gold Medal from the Pennsylvania Academy of Fine arts.

== Pittsburgh ==
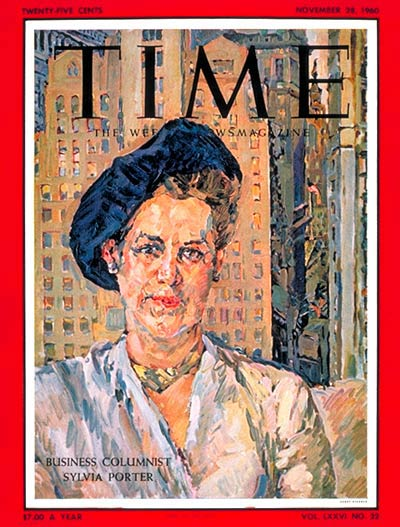
Portrait of Sylvia Porter for Time

From 1952 to 1953, Koerner was Artist-in-Residence at Pennsylvania College for Women (now Chatham University) in Pittsburgh, PA, where he met his second wife, Joan Marlene Frasher (born 1932, Escanaba, Michigan), a violinist and undergraduate music major at the College. During this period, Koerner changed radically his style, technique, and process. Where before he had painted in his studio from drawings and preliminary studies, creating works in a highly finished style, evocative of Renaissance painters, now he worked solely from life, and in a broader style evocative, in its palette and approach to brushwork, of Paul Cézanne. He settled in Pittsburgh's Squirrel Hill neighborhood, which through its geography of hills and bridges, and its long-established Jewish community, reminded him of Vienna. He used friends, family, and students as models. Although a well-known personality in Pittsburgh, Koerner's pictures—enigmatic, comical, and often monumental in scale—baffled many art critics.

From 1955 to 1967, Koerner painted forty-six portrait covers for Time magazine. Because he refused to work from photographs, all Koerner's sitters, including Maria Callas, John F. Kennedy, Robert F. Kennedy, Paul Getty, Jimmy Clark, and Barbra Streisand, posed for many hours for their portraits, usually during the most eventful times of their lives; but this method gave their likenesses an immediacy meant to outdo photographs, which were increasingly featured on Time's covers as it confronted an ever more competitive market. From 1966 on, annual trips to Vienna shifted Koerner art from American subjects, which had preoccupied him since about 1948, to ones mingling the landscapes and people of Vienna and Pittsburgh. The center of Koerner's output were large-scale allegorical paintings made up of sixteen canvases assembled in four rows of four. In 1965 he was elected into the National Academy of Design as an Associate member and became a full Academician in 1967. He received the 1986 Hazlett Memorial Award (now Pennsylvania's Governor's Award for the Arts).

== Late style and death ==
Koerner produced many thousands of works in his career. In the 1980s, he worked mostly in watercolor, pressing the medium to monumental tasks and formats, including three monumental 16-panel paintings executed on heavy watercolor paper stretched like canvas over wooden frames.

During the last decade of his life, Koerner painted again mainly in oils, favoring a new, square format, and simplifying his motifs. In these works "Koerner condense[d] his experience as a plein-air painter of uncanny views." Increasing interest in émigré artists brought his work new critical notice in Austria and the States. After his death, his work was shown in a major retrospective in Vienna (1997) and an exhibition of his early work at the Frick Art and Historical Center in Pittsburgh (2003).

Koerner died in 1991 in St. Pölten, Austria, following complications from a hit-and-run accident on his bicycle in the Wachau in Austria. He is buried beside his wife in Pittsburgh's Homewood Cemetery. His son Joseph Koerner is a professor of history of art at Harvard University and a documentary film-maker. His daughter Stephanie Koerner is a lecturer at Liverpool University's School of Architecture.

== Legacy ==
Koerner's art is represented in many public collections including the Whitney Museum of American Art, the Metropolitan Museum of Art, the Sheldon Museum of Art, the Österreichische Galerie Belvedere, Wien Museum, Yale University Art Gallery, Columbus Museum of Art, Carnegie Museum of Art, and Harvard Art Museums. My Parents II figures in Frank O'Hara's 1950 "Poem" (The flies are getting slower now): "Here, as in the/ gallery, Henry Koerner’s parents/ say goodbye forever." Yale University's Henry Koerner Center for Emeritus Faculty, opened in 2003, was named in the artist's honor. The Center celebrated it 20th-Anniversary Rededication with an exhibition of works by Koerner, mostly donated newly to the Center. In 2019 Henry Koerner Hall was opened at Bard College Berlin. Koerner's first painting (My Parents I) features prominently in the 2019 film The Burning Child. The Henry Koerner House in Pittsburgh, which Koerner used as his residence and studio, was named a Historic Landmark by the Pittsburgh History & Landmarks Foundation in 2021 and was added to the National Register of Historic Places in 2023. More recently, Koerner's art has been featured in exhibitions in Athens, Georgia (Georgia Museum of Art) Berlin (Haus am Waldsee), Pittsburgh (Rivers of Steel), and Huntington, New York (Huckster Museum of Art).

== Solo exhibitions (selection) ==
- Ausstellung Henry Koerner U.S.A. Gemälde und Graphik. Haus am Waldsee, Berlin. 1947.
- Henry Koerner. Midtown Galleries, New York, NY. 1948.
- Retrospective Exhibition of the Work of Henry Koerner. Pennsylvania College for Women, Pittsburgh, PA. 1952.
- Henry Koerner. Exhibition of Paintings and Drawings. M. H. de Young Memorial Museum, San Francisco, CA. 1953.
- Henry Koerner. Legion of Honor, San Francisco, CA. 1956.
- Henry Koerner. Hammer Galleries, New York, NY. 1964.
- Henry Koerner Retrospective Exhibition. Westmoreland Museum of American Art, Greensburg, PA. 1971.
- Henry Koerner. Concept Art Gallery, New York, Ny. 1981.
- Henry Koerner, From Vienna to Pittsburgh: The Art of Henry Koerner. Carnegie Museum of Art, Pittsburgh, PA. 1983.
- Henry Koerner: The Utica Period. Emerson Gallery at Hamilton College, Clinton, NY. 1986.
- Henry Koerner: From Vienna To the USA. ACA Galleries, New York. 1986.
- Unheimliche Heimat—Henry Koerner 1915–1991. Österreichische Galerie Belvedere, Vienna. 1997.
- The Early Work of Henry Koerner. The Frick Pittsburgh, Pittsburgh, PA. 2003.
- Henry Koerner's Pittsburgh. Chatham University, Pittsburgh, PA. 2009.
- Henry Koerner: The Real and Imagined. The Von Liebig Art Center, Naples, FL. 2010–2011.
- Real Portraits: Time Covers by Henry Koerner. Yale University. 2015.
- Henry Koerner. Memory and Motif. Yale University. 2023.
- Paintable Pittsburgh: The Art of Henry Koerner. Rivers of Steel. 2026.

== Bibliography ==
- Haus am Waldsee, Ausstellung Henry Koerner: Gemälde und Graphik, 1945–1947. Berlin, Haus am Waldsee, 1947.
- Gail Stravitzky, From Vienna To Pittsburgh: The Art of Henry Koerner, exh. cat. Pittsburgh: Museum of Art, Carnegie Institute, 1983. Henry Koerner, from Vienna to the U.S.A.: A Retrospective Exhibition, Paintings, Watercolors, and Drawings : Selected Works 1930 to 1986, May 3 to 24, 1986, ACA Galleries
- Alexander Eliot, Joseph Leo Koerner, and Betty Rogers Rubenstein, Henry Koerner: From Vienna to the USA. A Retrospective Exhibition Paintings, Watercolors, and Drawings. New York, ACA Galleries, 1986.
- Emigrants and Exiles: A Lost Generation of Austrian Artists in America, 1920–1950. Exhibition Catalogue by John Czaplicka and David Mickenberg. Evanstan: Mary and Leigh Block Gallery, Northwestern University, 1996.
- Joseph Leo Koerner. Unheimliche Heimat—Henry Koerner 1915–1991, exh. cat. Vienna: Österreichische Galerie, 1997. Unheimliche Heimat: Henry Koerner, 1915-1991
- The Early Work of Henry Koerner. Exh. cat. by Edith Balas. Pittsburgh: Frick Art & Historical Center, 2003.
- Cora Sol Goldstein, Capturing the German Eye: American Visual Propaganda in Occupied Germany. Chicago: University of Chicago Press, 2009, pp. 91–96.
- Cozzolino, Robert. "Henry Koerner, Honoré Sharrer, and the Subversion of Veauty: 'Magic Realism' and the Photograph." In Shared Intelligence: American Painting and the Photograph, pp. 102–121. Exhibition catalogue ed. Barbara Buhler Lynes and Jonathan Weinberg. Berkeley, CA: University of California Press, 2011.
- Coney Island: Visions of an American Dreamland. Exh. cat. by Robin Jaffee Frank. Hartford and New Haven: Wadsworth Atheneum Museum of Art and Yale University Press, 2015.
- Real Portraits: "Time" Covers by Henry Koerner. Exh. cat. by Annabel Patterson, Philip Eliasoph and Jonathan Weinberg. New Haven: Yale University, 2015.
- Artists in Exile: Expressions of Loss and Hope. Exh. cat. ed. by Franke V. Josenhans. New Haven: Yale University, 2015, pp. 31–47.
- Florian Traussnig, Geistiger Widerstand von Aussen: Österreicher in US-Propagandainstitutions im Zweiten Weltkrieg. Vienna: Böhlau Verlag, 2017.
- Kathrin Hoffmann-Curtius, with Sigrid Philipps, Judenmord: Art and the Holocaust in Post-War Germany, trans. Anthony Mathews. London: Reaktion Books, 2018.
- Extra Ordinary: Magic, Mystery, and Imagination in American Realism. Exh. cat. ed. by Jeffrey Richmond-Moll. Athens, GA: Georgia Museum of Art, 2021.
- Henry Koerner: Memory and Motif. Exh. cat. New Haven: Yale Henry Koerner Center, 2023.
