= Art in a State of Siege =

2025 art history book by Joseph Leo Koerner

- Author: Joseph Leo Koerner
- Language: English
- Subject: Art history
- Publisher: Princeton University Press
- Publication date: 4 February 2025
- Media type: Print (hardcover)
- Pages: 408
- ISBN: 978-0-691-26721-0

Art in a State of Siege is a 2025 book by art historian Joseph Leo Koerner, published by Princeton University Press. It examines the production and interpretation of art during periods of political emergency through the work of Hieronymus Bosch, Max Beckmann, and William Kentridge.

== Background and contents ==
Developed from Koerner's 2016 E. H. Gombrich Lectures at the Warburg Institute, the book's title comes from a public lecture given by Kentridge at the National Festival of the Arts in Grahamstown in June 1986, shortly after the apartheid government of South Africa declared a nationwide state of emergency.

Koerner organizes the book as a triptych. Its first and longest section discusses Bosch, particularly The Garden of Earthly Delights and the painting's later interpreters; a shorter middle section examines Beckmann's 1927 Self-Portrait in Tuxedo and his work during the Weimar Republic and Nazi period; and the final section considers Kentridge's prints and animated charcoal drawings in relation to apartheid and its aftermath. An opening discussion of Aby Warburg introduces a non-chronological and "besieged" method of art historical interpretation that connects the creation and later reception of artworks and visual images. Other recurring point-of-view figures include Erwin Panofsky, Wilhelm Fraenger, Carl Schmitt, and Ernst Jünger, with Schmitt's concepts of the friend–enemy distinction and the state of exception forming an important part of Koerner's argument. Koerner's use of Schmitt hinges on the latter's meditations on Bosch's Garden of Delights written while imprisoned in Nuremberg for possible war crimes in Nuremberg.

== Reception ==
The book was widely and positively reviewed. Reviewers praised the book's erudition, formal ambition, and political currency while differing over the meaning and persuasiveness of its central framework. Kirkus Reviews described it as demanding but rewarding, Christoph Irmscher called it a captivating, if challenging, study,, and W. J. T. Mitchell wrote it "is destined become one of the great classics of art history." Critics including Gabriel Josipovici, Julian Bell, Hal Foster, and Andrei Pop praised the book's ambition, scope, and writing style, but questioned aspects of Koerner's interpretation of Bosch, developed from his earlier publications, or argued that the concepts of siege, emergency, and Schmittian enmity were sometimes applied too broadly across different historical periods. Mitch Merbach emphasized the book's unusual style of presentation, noting that "an inveterate writer, the author builds his narrative - along with his argument - novelistically, while also drawing on certain film techniques for shuffling time." Mark Cheetham flagged the book's "personal, even autobiographical" undertones, noting, "It is in this way that Koerner's thinking is especially close to Kentridge's."
