= Psychodynamics =

Approach to psychology

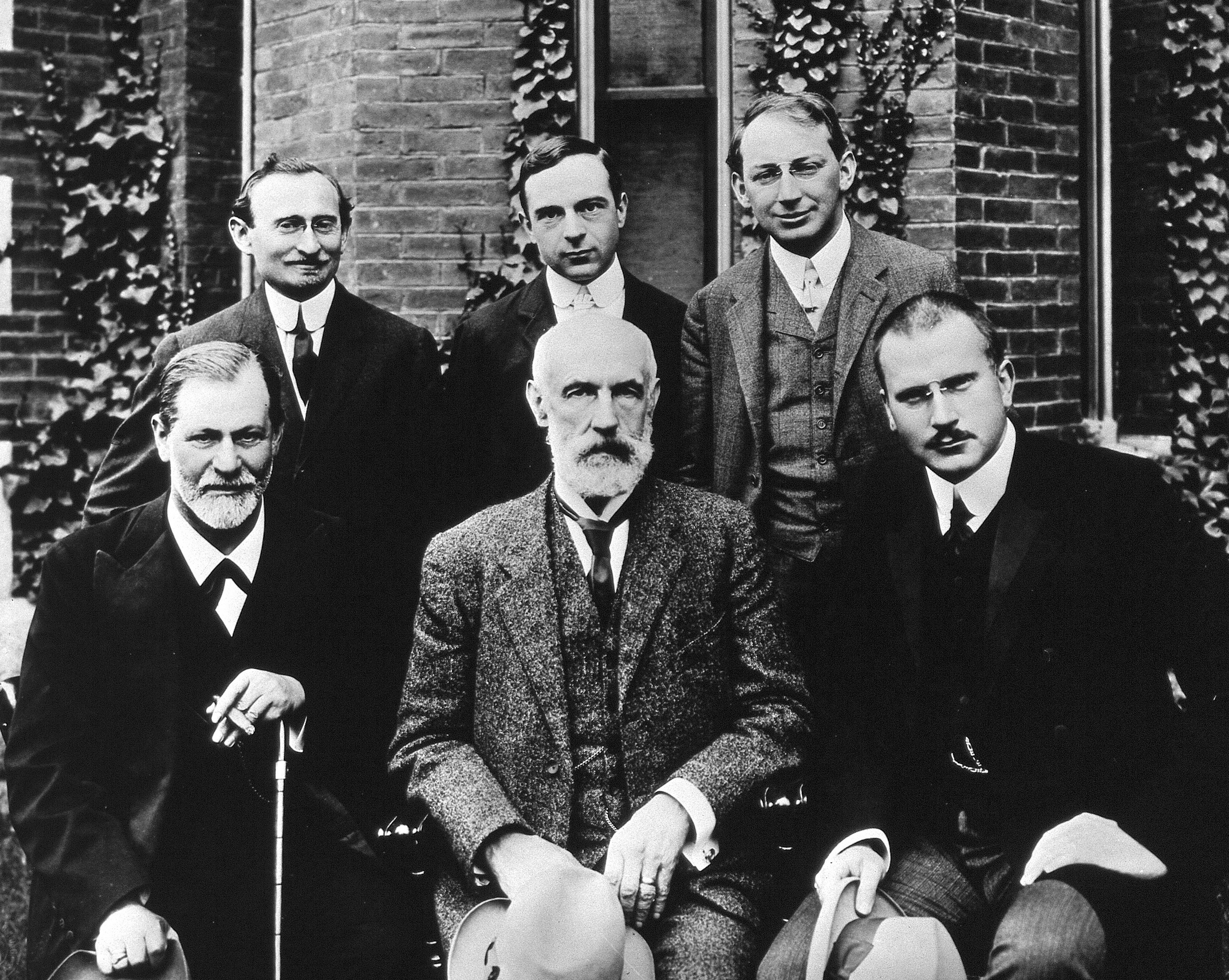
Front row, left to right: Sigmund Freud, G. Stanley Hall, Carl Jung; Back row, left to right: Sándor Ferenczi, Ernest Jones, Abraham A. Brill, at: Clark University in Worcester, Massachusetts. Date: September 1909.

Psychodynamics, also known as psychodynamic psychology, in its broadest sense, is an approach to psychology that emphasizes systematic study of the psychological forces underlying human behavior, feelings, and emotions and how they might relate to early experience. It is especially interested in the dynamic relations between conscious motivation and unconscious motivation.

The term psychodynamics is sometimes used to refer specifically to the psychoanalytical approach developed by Sigmund Freud (1856–1939) and his followers. Freud was inspired by the theory of thermodynamics and used the term psychodynamics to describe the processes of the mind as flows of psychological energy (libido or psi) in an organically complex brain. However, modern usage differentiates psychoanalytic practice as referring specifically to the earliest forms of psychotherapy, practiced by Freud and his immediate followers, and psychodynamic practice as practice that is informed by psychoanalytic theory, but diverges from the traditional practice model.

In the treatment of psychological distress, psychodynamic psychotherapy tends to be a less intensive (once- or twice-weekly) modality than the classical Freudian psychoanalysis treatment (of 3–5 sessions per week) and typically relies less on the traditional practices of psychoanalytic therapy, such as the patient facing away from the therapist during treatment and free association. Psychodynamic therapies depend upon a psychoanalytic understanding of inner conflict, wherein unconscious thoughts, desires, and memories influence behavior and psychological problems are caused by unconscious or repressed conflicts.

Widespread critique of psychoanalysis’s scientific credibility contributed to a decline in the use of psychodynamic therapy as the primary modality of psychotherapy, with cognitive–behavioral therapy and pharmacological approaches becoming more prominent. Early outcome research often suffered from methodological limitations and produced mixed results, leading to skepticism about its efficacy. Empirical support at that time appeared strongest in areas such as the treatment of personality disorders. However, more recent research has revisited these claims.

Research on the efficacy of psychodynamic therapy has grown substantially in recent decades. Systematic reviews and meta-analyses generally find psychodynamic interventions to be comparable in effectiveness to established treatments such as cognitive–behavioral therapy and pharmacotherapy across a range of conditions, including depression, anxiety, somatic symptom disorders, and personality disorders.

Evidence is particularly strong for long-term benefits, with some studies showing continued improvement after treatment ends.

While early trials often suffered from small samples and methodological limitations, more recent studies provide robust support for both short-term and long-term psychodynamic approaches.

== Overview ==
In general, psychodynamics is the study of the interrelationship of various parts of the mind, personality, or psyche as they relate to mental, emotional, or motivational forces especially at the unconscious level. The mental forces involved in psychodynamics are often divided into two parts: (a) the interaction of the emotional and motivational forces that affect behavior and mental states, especially on a subconscious level; (b) inner forces affecting behavior: the study of the emotional and motivational forces that affect behavior and states of mind.

Freud proposed that psychological energy was constant (hence, emotional changes consisted only in displacements) and that it tended to rest (point attractor) through discharge (catharsis).

In mate selection psychology, psychodynamics is defined as the study of the forces, motives, and energy generated by the deepest of human needs.

In general, psychodynamics studies the transformations and exchanges of "psychic energy" within the personality. A focus in psychodynamics is the connection between the energetics of emotional states in the Id, ego and super-ego as they relate to early childhood developments and processes. At the heart of psychological processes, according to Freud, is the ego, which he envisions as battling with three forces: the id, the super-ego, and the outside world. The id is the unconscious reservoir of libido, the psychic energy that fuels instincts and psychic processes. The ego serves as the general manager of personality, making decisions regarding the pleasures that will be pursued at the id's demand, the person's safety requirements, and the moral dictates of the superego that will be followed. The superego refers to the repository of an individual's moral values, divided into the conscience – the internalization of a society's rules and regulations – and the ego-ideal – the internalization of one's goals. Hence, the basic psychodynamic model focuses on the dynamic interactions between the id, ego, and superego. Psychodynamics, subsequently, attempts to explain or interpret behavior or mental states in terms of innate emotional forces or processes.

== History ==
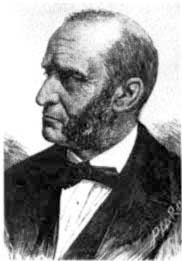
Ernst von Brücke, early developer of psychodynamics

Freud used the term psychodynamics to describe the processes of the mind as flows of psychological energy (libido) in an organically complex brain. The idea for this came from his first year adviser, Ernst von Brücke at the University of Vienna, who held the view that all living organisms, including humans, are basically energy-systems to which the principle of the conservation of energy applies. This principle states that "the total amount of energy in any given physical system is always constant, that energy quanta can be changed but not annihilated, and that consequently when energy is moved from one part of the system, it must reappear in another part." This principle is at the very root of Freud's ideas, whereby libido, which is primarily seen as sexual energy, is transformed into other behaviors. However, it is now clear that the term energy in physics means something quite different from the term energy in relation to mental functioning.

Psychodynamics was initially further developed by Carl Jung, Alfred Adler and Melanie Klein. By the mid-1940s and into the 1950s, the general application of the "psychodynamic theory" had been well established.

In his 1988 book Introduction to Psychodynamics – a New Synthesis, psychiatrist Mardi J. Horowitz states that his own interest and fascination with psychodynamics began during the 1950s, when he heard Ralph Greenson, a popular local psychoanalyst who spoke to the public on topics such as "People who Hate", speak on the radio at UCLA. In his radio discussion, according to Horowitz, he "vividly described neurotic behavior and unconscious mental processes and linked psychodynamics theory directly to everyday life."

In the 1950s, American psychiatrist Eric Berne built on Freud's psychodynamic model, particularly that of the "ego states", to develop a psychology of human interactions called transactional analysis which, according to physician James R. Allen, is a "cognitive-behavioral approach to treatment and that it is a very effective way of dealing with internal models of self and others as well as other psychodynamic issues".

Around the 1970s, a growing number of researchers began departing from the psychodynamics model and Freudian subconscious. Many felt that the evidence was over-reliant on imaginative discourse in therapy, and on patient reports of their state-of-mind. These subjective experiences are inaccessible to others. Philosopher of science Karl Popper argued that much of Freudianism was untestable and therefore not scientific. In 1975 literary critic Frederick Crews began a decades-long campaign against the scientific credibility of Freudianism. This culminated in Freud: The Making of an Illusion which aggregated years of criticism from many quarters. Medical schools and psychology departments no longer offer much training in psychodynamics, according to a 2007 survey. An Emory University psychology professor explained, “I don’t think psychoanalysis is going to survive unless there is more of an appreciation for empirical rigor and testing.”

=== Freudian analysis ===
According to American psychologist Calvin S. Hall, from his 1954 Primer in Freudian Psychology:

Freud greatly admired Brücke and quickly became indoctrinated by this new dynamic physiology. Thanks to Freud's singular genius, he was to discover some twenty years later that the laws of dynamics could be applied to man's personality as well as to his body. When he made his discovery Freud proceeded to create a dynamic psychology. A dynamic psychology is one that studies the transformations and exchanges of energy within the personality. This was Freud’s greatest achievement, and one of the greatest achievements in modern science, It is certainly a crucial event in the history of psychology.

At the heart of psychological processes, according to Freud, is the ego, which he sees battling with three forces: the id, the super-ego, and the outside world. Hence, the basic psychodynamic model focuses on the dynamic interactions between the id, ego, and superego. Psychodynamics, subsequently, attempts to explain or interpret behavior or mental states in terms of innate emotional forces or processes. In his writings about the "engines of human behavior", Freud used the German word Trieb, a word that can be translated into English as either instinct or drive.

In the 1930s, Freud's daughter Anna Freud began to apply Freud's psychodynamic theories of the "ego" to the study of parent-child attachment and especially deprivation and in doing so developed ego psychology.

=== Jungian analysis ===
At the turn of the 20th century, during these decisive years, a young Swiss psychiatrist named Carl Jung had been following Freud's writings and had sent him copies of his articles and his first book, the 1907 Psychology of Dementia Praecox, in which he upheld the Freudian psychodynamic viewpoint, although with some reservations. That year, Freud invited Jung to visit him in Vienna. The two men, it is said, were greatly attracted to each other, and they talked continuously for thirteen hours. This led to a professional relationship in which they corresponded on a weekly basis, for a period of six years.

Carl Jung's contributions in psychodynamic psychology include:

1. The psyche tends toward wholeness.
2. The self is composed of the ego, the personal unconscious, the collective unconscious. The collective unconscious contains the archetypes which manifest in ways particular to each individual.
3. Archetypes are composed of dynamic tensions and arise spontaneously in the individual and collective psyche. Archetypes are autonomous energies common to the human species. They give the psyche its dynamic properties and help organize it. Their effects can be seen in many forms and across cultures.
4. The Transcendent Function: The emergence of the third resolves the split between dynamic polar tensions within the archetypal structure.
5. The recognition of the spiritual dimension of the human psyche.
6. The role of images which spontaneously arise in the human psyche (images include the interconnection between affect, images, and instinct) to communicate the dynamic processes taking place in the personal and collective unconscious, images which can be used to help the ego move in the direction of psychic wholeness.
7. Recognition of the multiplicity of psyche and psychic life, that there are several organizing principles within the psyche, and that they are at times in conflict.

== See also ==
- Ernst Wilhelm Brücke
- Yisrael Salantar
- Cathexis
- Object relations theory
- Reaction formation
- Robert Langs
