= Ernst Wilhelm von Brücke =

German physician and physiologist (1819–1892)

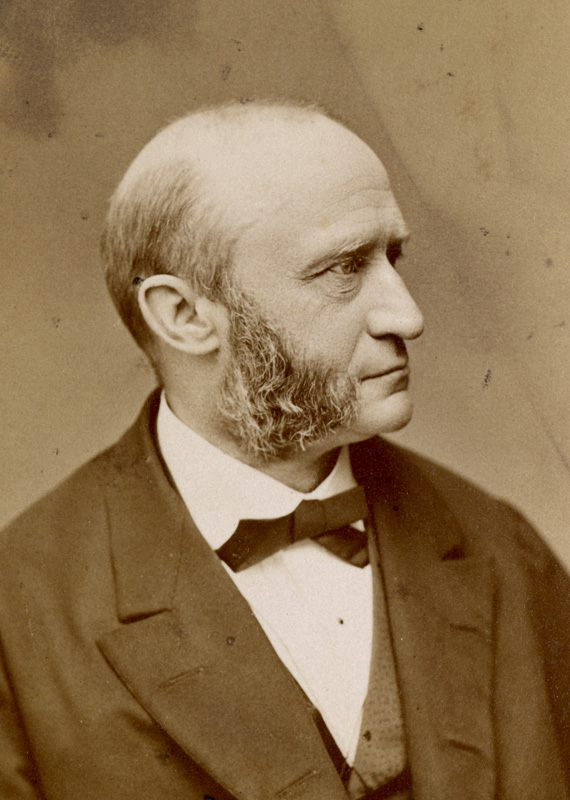
- Born: Ernst Wilhelm Brücke; 6 July 1819; Berlin, Province of Brandenburg, Prussia
- Died: 7 January 1892 (aged 72); Vienna, Austria-Hungary
- Known for: Psychodynamics
- Scientific career
- Fields: Physiology
- Notable students: Sigmund Freud

Ernst Wilhelm von Brücke (German: [fɔn ˈbʁʏkə]; 6 July 1819 – 7 January 1892) was a German physician and physiologist. He worked on the nature of cells, physiology of language, the effect of electricity on muscles, and studies of albumin. He also made significant contributions in the fields of physics, plant physiology, microscopic anatomy, and experimental physiology. He was an influential professor of Sigmund Freud.

== Biography ==
He was born Ernst Wilhelm Brücke in Berlin. He graduated in medicine at the University of Berlin in 1842, and during the following year, he became a research assistant to Johannes Peter Müller. In 1845, he founded the Physikalische Gesellschaft (Physical Society) in Berlin, together with Emil Du Bois-Reymond, Hermann von Helmholtz and others, in the house of physicist Heinrich Gustav Magnus. Later on, this became known as the Deutsche Physikalische Gesellschaft (German Society of Physics). In 1846, Brücke was elected teacher of anatomy in the Akademie der Bildenden Künste, in Berlin. Following that, in 1848, he was appointed as professor of physiology at the University of Königsberg, replacing Karl Friedrich Burdach (1776–1847). In 1849, he acquired similar duties at the University of Vienna. In 1873, Emperor Franz Joseph I honored Brücke with a noble title—von Brücke—but he rarely used it.

Ernst Fleischl von Marxow (1846–1891) and Joseph Paneth (1857–1890), two colleagues of Freud, were assistants to Brücke in Vienna; however, Brücke is most noted for his influence on Sigmund Freud, one of his other medical students. Freud began studying under Brücke in 1877 and continued doing so until 1883. He was tasked to examine the biology of nervous tissue, specifically comparing the brains of humans and other vertebrates to those of invertebrates. Freud would many times call Brücke the professor who shaped him the most. This influence led to the development of the science of psychodynamics. Brücke's teachings did not only influence Freud's work; parts of the noted psychologist's theory were pulled directly from his professor's principles, specifically the idea that all living things are dynamic and must bow to the laws of chemistry and physics.

Brücke retired from the University of Vienna in September 1890 and began working on a book he had long planned to write: Beauty and the Flaws of the Human Stature, which ended up being published as The Human Figure: Its Beauties and Defects.

== Research ==
During Brücke's lifetime, specialization was not popular. Because of this, he had very diverse interests and made assorted contributions to the scientific community. Early on in his career, Brücke was interested in optics, which led him to research the tapetum lucidum of the vertebrate eye and the action of the ciliary muscle. Following that, Brücke studied the eye's absorption of various light rays, the mystery of color sensation, and positive and negative afterimages. His work in the science of optics was instrumental towards Helmholtz's invention of the ophthalmoscope.

Further investigation of this related subject found Brücke examining the color changes in chameleons and cephalopods, then studying pigment cells, and observing how muscular contraction is influenced by the duration of a stimulus.

Brücke also made contributions in a completely different discipline, phonetics, when he wrote one of his early works directed at teachers of the deaf: Grundzüge der Physiologie und Systematik der Sprachlaute für Linguisten und Taubstummenlehre.

In addition to optics, cellular investigations, and phonetics, Brücke had a deep interest in philosophy and aesthetics, which was demonstrated by his authorship of semi-popular books, specifically a work on the physiology of color in applied art. Brücke's interest in color and the arts spread out from the scientific aspects of color into the industrial world as he laid down the principles of color combinations for the guidance of workers in fabrics. From this he took the short step from color to artistic form and to the declaration of the underlying principles of what makes art beautiful.

== Ideas ==
=== Principles ===
Brücke was a positivist. During his time, it was not an organized school of thought, but more a general attitude toward man, nature, and methods of investigation. He and others who shared his beliefs wanted to bring the approach of the natural sciences in to the investigation of all human thought and action. Brücke delved deeply into his position on positivism in Lectures on Physiology, a course that was published in 1876.

While a medical student in Berlin along with his colleague Emil Du Bois-Reymond, Brücke condemned the ideas of pantheism, all nature mysticism, and all talk of occult divine forces manifesting themselves in the real world. These superstitions contrasted directly with their principles of positivism and their more materialistic views of the world. Later, the two researchers, along with Hermann von Helmholtz, turned their sights against the popular philosophic theory of the time: vitalism. Vitalism is the idea that living things are only different from inanimate objects because they contain a "vital spark", which some believed to be the soul. The three partners contested this theory, stating that only the common physical-chemical functions are involved in the life of an organism.

The alternate theory that the researchers did adhere to was one that became very popular in the coming years: naturalism. This theory fit perfectly with the beliefs of Brücke and his colleagues, as it stated that everything comes from natural properties and sources.

=== Feud ===
Josef Hyrtl was the head of the institute of anatomy at the University of Vienna, and a strong believer in the vitalist theory. He and Brücke initially got along well, and it was Hyrtl's influence that allowed Brücke to be a professor at the university. However, the longer they worked in close quarters, the less civil they became. A feud started that would last throughout their academic careers.

Hyrtl was an older traditionalist with regard to physiology. He was used to anatomy being the dominant method of medical teaching and training, and Brücke challenged this with his newer version of physiology, which was animal experimentation. Brücke built a wooden hut to house dogs for his experiments in a location near both his and Hyrtl's apartments. Hyrtl made complaints that the barking of the dogs was preventing him from sleeping, and this may have been true, however, his real reason for complaining was that he disliked Brücke's methods of investigation into physiology.

The feud expanded into a disagreement about the function of the semicircular canals of the inner ear. Hyrtl believed that, based on their shape, the canals were used for directional hearing, while Brücke, having previous experimental knowledge about animals, concluded that the semicircular canals of the inner ear were instead sensory organs for equilibrium. This feud was a part of a deeper disagreement having to do with the two different philosophical viewpoints— vitalism and naturalism— that Hyrtl and Brücke followed.

=== Debate ===
In the 19th century, there was a debate about the inaccuracy in the way artists represented movement. This was spurred by the invention of chronophotography and the assumption that this new technology would be able to change the habits of human and animal locomotion from a more aesthetic and "conventional" (incorrect) locomotion to a more natural one.

The debate was expanded to the idea that artists should make their representations, such as paintings and sculptures, in a way that accurately reflects the mechanics of the organism they are imitating. For example, artists painting a horse should paint the horse as frozen in a moment of movement that accurately reflects how a real horse moves, instead of an aesthetic, incorrect position. Brücke disagreed with this idea. He believed that artists should not be forced to contain the aesthetic of their art within parameters of reality and mechanics, because the invention of chronophotography was an ineffective stimulus for changing the locomotion of humans and animals, as it would not prompt the automatic correction of apparent impractical postures and movements. To this end, Brücke believed that there had been a decline in art ever since the artist endeavored to mimic perfect reality instead of seeking out beauty in its multitude of appearances.

== Selected works ==
- Ueber die Bewegungen der Mimosa pudica. Archiv für Anatomie, Physiologie und wissenschaftliche Medicin: 434–455 (1848) -- On the movements of Mimosa pudica.
- Beiträge zur vergleichenden Anatomie und Physiologie des Gefässsystems. Denkschriften: Akademie der Wissenschaften Wien, Mathematisch-Naturwissenschaftliche Classe 3: 335–367 (1852) -- Contributions to the comparative anatomy and physiology of the vascular system.
- Grundzüge der Physiologie und Systematik der Sprachlaute für Linguisten und Taubstummenlehrer. Wien: C. Gerold & Sohn (1856) -- Fundamentals of physiology and classification of speech sounds for linguists and deaf teachers.
- Die Elementarorganismen. Sitzungsberichte der Mathematisch-Naturwissenschaftlichen Classe der Kaiserlichen Akademie der Wissenschaften 44: 381–406 (1861) -- Elementary organisms.
- Die Physiologie der Farben für die Zwecke der Kunstgewerbe. Leipzig: S. Hirzel (1866) -- The physiology of colors for the purposes of the arts.
- Die physiologischen Grundlagen der neuhochdeutschen Verskunst. Wien: C. Gerold & Sohn (1871)
- Vorlesungen über Physiologie—Lectures on physiology.:
  - 1. 2., verm. u. verb. Aufl. 1875 Digital edition by the University and State Library Düsseldorf
  - 1. Physiologie des Kreislaufs, der Ernährung, der Absonderung, der Respiration und der Bewegungserscheinungen. 3., verm. u. verb. Aufl. 1881 Digital edition by the University and State Library Düsseldorf
  - 2. Physiologie der Nerven und der Sinnesorgane und Entwickelungsgeschichte. 2., verm. u. verb. Aufl. 1876 Digital edition by the University and State Library Düsseldorf
  - 2. Physiologie der Nerven und der Sinnesorgane und Entwickelungsgeschichte. 3., verm. u. verb. Aufl. 1884 Digital edition by the University and State Library Düsseldorf
  - 2 : S/S. 1886. Physiologie der Nerven und der Sinnesorgane und Entwickelungsgeschichte. 4., verm. u. verb. Aufl. 1887 Digital edition by the University and State Library Düsseldorf
