= Joseph Koerner =

American art historian (born 1958)

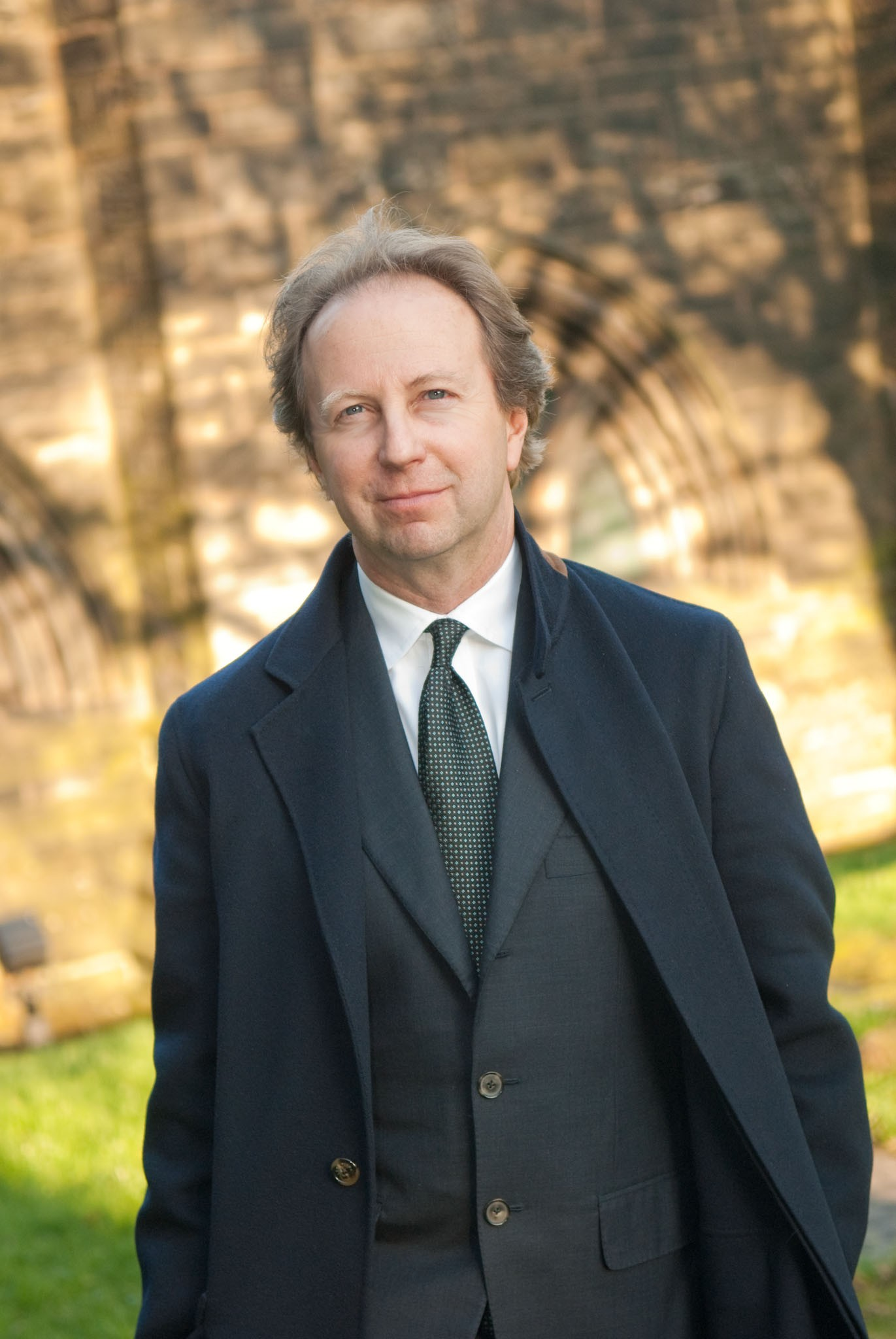
- Born: June 17, 1958 (age 68); Pittsburgh, Pennsylvania, U.S.
- Occupation: Art historian
- Spouse(s): Margaret Koster Koerner (formerly Margaret Lendia Koster; 2003–present)
- Awards: Jan Mitchell Prize (1992), ACE / Mercer's International Book Award (2005), Guggenheim Fellowship (2006), Mellon Distinguished Achievement Award (2009), CAA Distinguished Lifetime Achievement Award for Writing on Art (2020)

Academic background
- Education: Yale University (BA); Clare College, Cambridge (MA); Heidelberg University; University of California, Berkeley (MA, PhD)

Academic work
- Institutions: Harvard University; Goethe University Frankfurt; Courtauld Institute of Art; University College London; Oxford University; Cambridge University; Sciences Po
- Notable works: Caspar David Friedrich and the Subject of Landscape (1990), The Moment of Self-Portraiture (1993), The Reformation of the Image (2004), Bosch and Bruegel (2016)

Joseph Leo Koerner (born June 17, 1958) is an American art historian, author, and filmmaker. He is the Victor S. Thomas Professor of the History of Art and Architecture, Professor of Germanic Languages and Literatures at Harvard University, and currently Chair of Harvard's Department of History of Art and Architecture. Since 2008 he has also been Senior Fellow at the Harvard's Society of Fellows.

Specializing in Northern Renaissance and 19th-century art, Koerner is best known for his work on German art and Early Netherlandish painting. After teaching at Harvard from 1989 to 1999 (as professor since 1991), he moved to Frankfurt, where he was professor of modern art history at the Goethe University, and to London, where he held professorships at University College London and the Courtauld Institute before returning to Harvard in 2007. His feature film The Burning Child, a documentary combining personal and cultural history, was released in 2019. A new German version titled Wohnungswanderung ('Home Wandering') will be released in 2026.

== Early life and education ==
Son of the Vienna-born American painter Henry Koerner, Joseph Koerner was raised in the Squirrel Hill area of Pittsburgh, Pennsylvania, and in Vienna, Austria. He graduated from Taylor Allderdice High School in 1976. He attended Yale University (Trumbull College) where he received his B.A. in History, the Arts, and Letters in 1980; he was elected to Phi Beta Kappa in his junior year and graduated summa cum laude and with Honors in the Major. His senior thesis won the Wrexham Prize for best senior essay and the Theron Rockwell Field Prize, then usually awarded to Ph.D. dissertations. It treated the myth of Daedalus and Icarus from Ancient Greek art and literature through James Joyce, with chapters on Ben Jonson, John Milton, and John Keats and was published in German by Suhrkamp Verlag in 1983 as Die Suche nach dem Labyrinth ("In Quest of the Labyrinth"). An early deconstructive analysis of literary history, the book argued that the story of Daedalus's maze, and the escape from the maze by flight, concerned the problem of time as understood existentially and aesthetically. The relation between family time and chronological time remains a theme throughout Koerner's work. At Yale he worked for four years as research assistant for historian Peter Gay while Gay was writing his biography of Sigmund Freud and training to be a lay analyst.

Receiving in 1980 a Mellon Fellowship for study at Clare College, Cambridge, Koerner earned a Master of Arts in English Literature. Supervised by Frank Kermode, he wrote a (M.A.) dissertation on the image of the book in Joyce's Finnegans Wake; this text became part of his 1992 book on Paul Klee, co-written with Rainer Crone. On a one-year fellowship from the Deutscher Akademischer Austauschdienst (1982–1983) to Heidelberg University, he worked on Martin Heidegger's interpretations of Friedrich Hölderlin, studying philosophy and German literature with Hans-Georg Gadamer and Peter Pfaff. Work undertaken at Yale, Cambridge, and Heidelberg on Caspar David Friedrich, and a friendship with Frank Schirrmacher inspiring study of the German hermeneutical tradition, shifted Koerner's focus to the history of German art. He received an M.A. (1985) and Ph.D. in art history at the University of California, Berkeley, in 1988. His dissertation on self-portraiture in the German Renaissance was advised by Svetlana Alpers, James Marrow, and Stephen Greenblatt.

== Career ==
Koerner developed his characteristic technique most extensively in the opening chapters of his first art history book, Caspar David Friedrich and the Subject of Landscape (1990, Winner of the 1992 Mitchell Prize), written while the author was a Junior Fellow at Harvard's Society of Fellows. At Berkeley, Koerner began an association with the journal RES: Anthropology and Aesthetics, where he published numerous articles and editorials and served (since 1990) as the Associate Editor. During this period, Koerner was also a member of the research group Poetik und Hermeneutik in Konstanz in its later phase, 1987–1994, writing on the themes of festival and contingency, or accident.

Caspar David Friedrich and the Subject of Landscape became the third volume of Koerner's trilogy on German art. The first volume, The Moment of Self-Portraiture in German Renaissance Art (1993), winner of the 1994 George Wittenborn Memorial Award, studied Albrecht Dürer’s self-portraits and their distortion by Dürer's disciple, Hans Baldung Grien. The second volume, The Reformation of the Image (2004), winner of the inaugural ACE / MERCERS’ International Book Award, focussed on works by Lucas Cranach, and treated Protestant iconoclasm and its aftermath in painting and architecture. Among its claims was that, prior to Protestantism, Christian art already had iconoclasm built into it, most centrally in the image of the ruined Christ as hidden God. While writing the latter book, Koerner collaborated with Bruno Latour and Peter Weibel on the 2002 exhibition "Iconoclash" at the ZKM in Karlsruhe. Subsequently, he curated "Earth Tidings," a collaboration between the ZKM and the Staatliche Kunsthalle Karlsruhe, in conjunction with Latour and Weibel's 2020-21 exhibition "Critical Zones." He also was a contributing curator to ZKM's exhibitions "Making Things Public" (2005) and "Reset Modernity" (2016).

Koerner has also curated exhibitions of his father's work, including a 1997 retrospective at the Austrian National Gallery. Writing on his father's art prompted an autobiographical turn, first exemplified in lectures delivered widely in the mid-1990s and captured in video "The Family Portrait". In these texts, Koerner explored a large portrait of him by his father in which the artwork's creator is discovered to be neither the artist nor the sitter but a loss preceding both. In the 1990s, Koerner was a frequent contributor to the Frankfurter Allgemeine Zeitung and The New Republic. He has published book and exhibition reviews in The New York Review of Books and autobiographical non-fiction in Granta Magazine, anthologized (2020) in The Best American Essays. He has also written and taught on modern and contemporary artists, including Lucian Freud, Francesco Clemente, Vivienne Koorland, Luc Tuymans, and, most extensively, William Kentridge. He has also published over seventy scholarly articles, including in Critical Inquiry, Representations, October (journal), Word & Image, and The Art Bulletin, where he served as Book Review Editor in the early 1990s.

In the U.K., Koerner is known for his work as writer and presenter of the three-part Northern Renaissance (2006) and the feature-length Vienna: City of Dreams (2007), both produced in Scotland by the BBC and first broadcast on BBC Four. A popular speaker, Koerner has delivered the Tomàs Harris Lectures at University College London (1995), Polonsky Lectures at Hebrew University (2001), the Slade Lectures at Cambridge (2003) and at Oxford (2013), the Getty Lectures at USC (2005), Bross Lectures at University of Chicago (2007), the A. W. Mellon Lectures in the Fine Arts at the National Gallery of Art (2008), the Tanner Lectures on Human Values at Cambridge (2012), the E. H. Gombrich Lectures in the Classical Tradition at the Warburg Institute (2016), the Linbury Lecture at London's National Gallery (2022), and the Marina Kellen French Lecture at the American Academy in Berlin. His lecture and seminars as the Avenali Chair in the Humanities at U. C. Berkeley (2018) considered Hieronymus Bosch and William Kentridge through the concept, borrowed from Kentridge to describe his and Beckmann's art, of art "in a State of Siege." Koerner used that phrase as the title of the book Art in a State of Siege, a triptych on Bosch, Max Beckmann, Kentridge, with an introduction on Aby Warburg during Warburg's time in Kreuzlingen under psychiatric care. Released February 4, 2025 by Princeton University Press and short-listed for the 2025 Apollo magazine's Best Books of the Year the book has been understood by reviewers as novelistic, melding art history with biography and autobiography.

Koerner's recent publications concern the theme of enmity in the art of Bosch, including the book, based on Koerner's Mellon Lectures and widely reviewed, Bosch and Bruegel: From Enemy Painting to Everyday Life (2016). In it, he revisited the dual-artist format of The Moment of Self-Portraiture in German Renaissance Art, although with a different trajectory: from Bosch's artistry specializing in hatred to Pieter Bruegel the Elder's art that predicts a modern ethnographic perspective on the human. Pioneering "a way out of the monograph," this framework accords with his conception of the work of art as "inherently doubled," at once embedded in its historical context and anticipating its later receptions. Koerner's recent work concerns art in extreme states and contemporary debates concerning of monuments, which he is currently pursuing partly in collaboration with Professor Sarah Lewis. Koerner's early engagement with Romanticism continues in recent work, including collaboration on exhibitions on William Blake and Philipp Otto Runge at the Fitzwilliam Museum and Hamburger Kunsthalle, and on Casper David Friedrich at the Metropolitan Museum of Art concern German Romantic art and visual representations of time.

A member of the American Academy of Arts and Sciences (since 1995) and the American Philosophical Society (since 2008), and a Fellow of Society of Antiquaries of London (since 2021), Koerner has served on the boards of the Isabella Stewart Gardner Museum, the Yale University Art Gallery, the Frick Art Reference Library, the Warburg Institute, Ralston College, and the American Academy in Berlin. He received a Guggenheim Fellowship for his research on Reformation art (2006-7) and has served as visiting professor at the University of Konstanz (1991) and the Kunsthistorisches Institut in Florenz. In 2009, Koerner was one of three recipients of the Andrew W. Mellon Foundation's Distinguished Achievement Award, which funded an academic and creative project on homemaking (geographic, architectural, and psychic) in Vienna from Otto Wagner to the present day. Based at Harvard, the project produced the 2013 Slade Lectures series "City of Dreams" and the documentary film written, produced, and directed by Koerner, The Burning Child. In a book to appear in October 2026 with Hatja Cantz Verlag, Koerner offers a new, extended interpretation of Gustav Klimt's Beethoven Frieze as a dream of homemaking under psychic and ethical pressure.

Koerner has been primary advisor of some twenty-five doctoral dissertations completed at Harvard, the Courtauld Institute, University College London, and Frankfurt University. In 2020 the College Art Association honored him with its 2020 Distinguished Lifetime Achievement Award for Writing on Art. Koerner is a member of the Executive Committee of Harvard's Center for Jewish Studies and currently (until 2027) serves as Chair of Harvard's Department of History of Art and Architecture and on Harvard's Committee for Appointment and Promotions.

== Personal life ==
In 2003, Koerner married Margaret K Koerner (born Margaret Lendia Koster), also an art historian; a previous marriage ended in divorce.

== Books ==
- Die Suche nach dem Labyrinth—Der Mythos von Daidalos und Ikarus, 1983 ISBN 978-3-518-03499-6
- Caspar David Friedrich and the Subject of Landscape, 1990; 2nd ed. rev. and expanded, 2008 ISBN 978-1-86189-439-7
- Paul Klee: Legends of the Sign (with Rainer Crone), 1992 ISBN 978-02310-7034-8
- The Moment of Self-Portraiture in German Renaissance Art, 1993 ISBN 978-0-226-44999-9
- Unheimliche Heimat—Henry Koerner 1915–1991, 1997 ISBN 978-1-86189-439-7
- The Reformation of the Image, 2004 ISBN 978-0-226-44837-4
- Dürer's Hands, 2006 ISBN 978-0-912114-35-4
- Bosch and Bruegel: From Enemy Painting to Everyday Life, 2016 ISBN 978-0691172286
- Dürer's Mobility, 2022 ISBN 9781857096910
- Art in a State of Siege, 2025 ISBN 978-0691267210
- Gustav Klimt: The Beethoven Frieze (with Sylvia Liska), 2026 ISBN 978-3-7757-6178-9

== Filmography ==
- Northern Renaissance (2006) Writer/Presenter, 3-part series, 180 minutes. Premier: BBC Four (2006).
- Vienna: City of Dreams (2007) Writer/Presenter, 88 minutes. Premiere: BBC Four (2007).
- The Burning Child (completed 2018, released 2019) Writer/Presenter/Producer/and Director (with co-director Christian Bruun). 111 minutes. New German version Wohnungswanderung (2026)
