= Wish fulfillment =

Psychological concept

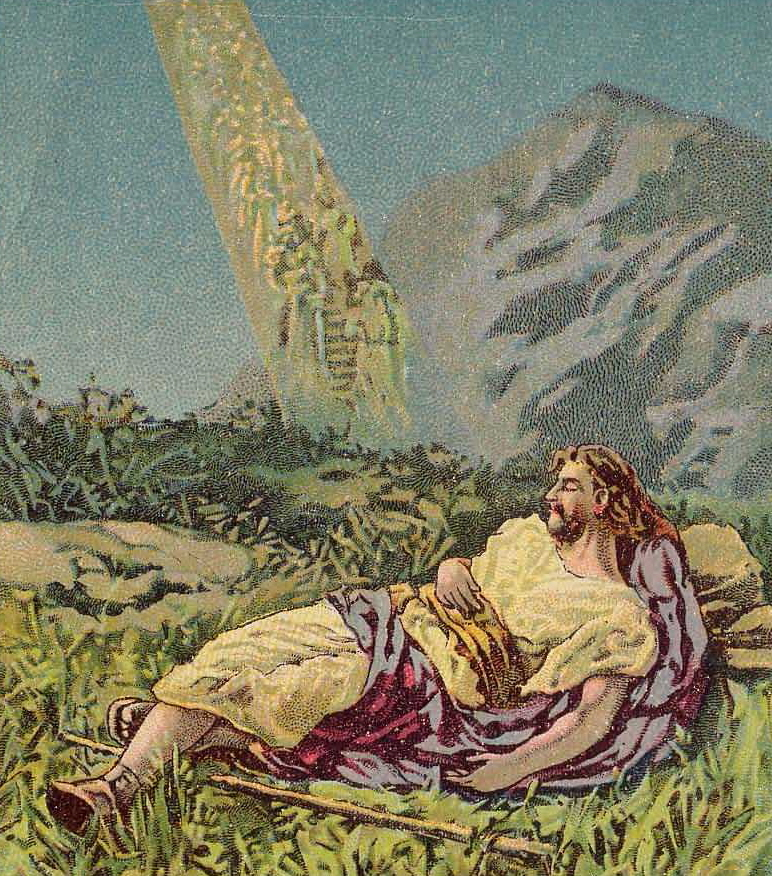
The biblical patriarch Jacob saw the ladder led to heaven, but Freud might have called it a phallic symbol.

Wish fulfillment is the satisfaction of a desire through an involuntary thought process. It can occur in dreams or in daydreams, in the symptoms of neurosis, or in the hallucinations of psychosis. This satisfaction is often indirect and requires interpretation to recognize.

Sigmund Freud coined the term (Wunscherfüllung) in 1900 in an early text titled The Interpretation of Dreams. It corresponds to a core principle of Freud’s Dream Theory. According to Freud, wish fulfillment occurs when unconscious desires are repressed by the ego and superego. This repression often stems from guilt and taboos imposed by society. Dreams are attempts by the unconscious to resolve some repressed conflict.

== In Freud's The Interpretation of Dreams ==
Sigmund Freud's fundamental work The Interpretation of Dreams marks an important date in the history of psychoanalysis. For the first time, a scientific approach to dreams was attempted. On the one hand, it was a moment of systematisation of the analytical theory that would become metapsychology, and on the other hand, it was a book that made psychoanalysis known, but not without raising a lot of criticism.

In The Interpretation of Dreams, challenging the dominant scientific theories of his time for which the dream is not a mental act, but a somatic (i.e. physical or bodily) process revealed only by certain psychic signs, he argues that dreams are "psychic acts" and that they are "nothing more than a special form of our thinking, which is made possible by the conditions of the sleeping state". Since his analysis of neurotics had taught him that the most complicated thought activities can take place without the intervention of consciousness, he asserted that dreams are proof of the existence of unconscious psychic acts, demonstrated that they have a meaning and can be interpreted by a "scientific method", that of psychoanalysis.

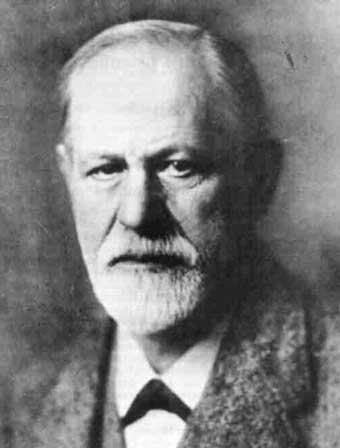
Wish fulfillment (Wunscherfüllung) was coined by Sigmund Freud in The Interpretations of Dreams.

The first of the dreams, a dream of Freud's reported and analysed in The Interpretation of Dreams, the dream known as "Irma's injection", is a dream that can be said to be inaugural and founding. With this dream, dated 1895, he begins the presentation of his method of interpretation and argues that, through his analysis, for the first time the "enigma" of dreams has been revealed. He concludes at the end of his analysis:

"When the work of interpretation has been completed the dream may be recognised as the fulfillment of a wish."

In other words, dreams are the fulfillment of unconscious wishes that are suppressed by the conscious mind, either because they are deemed unacceptable or because they conflict with societal norms. Therefore, they constitute a source of information about the dreamer's deepest desires and fears, as well as the unconscious conflicts that may be holding them back in their waking lives. However, the meaning of a dream must be interpreted, since the desires are not represented as they are, because at the same time, the reactionary formation opposing this fulfillment of the desire is brought into play. The manifest content of the dream must be freed from the deformation it has undergone. The dream thus presents itself as a valuable means of knowing the neurosis.

In the last pages of this work, he wrote: "The interpretation of dreams is the via regia (Royal Road) to a knowledge of the unconscious element in our psychic life." A "royal road" that he had begun to follow a few years earlier and which led him to the elaboration of a theory of dreams in which the dream takes on the value of paradigm. According to him, dreams always contain in germ the entire psychology of neuroses, the structure of dreams is "susceptible of universal application", and the "complete psychic act" that is the dream makes it possible to shed light on the mechanisms of other psychic formations as well as to account for a normal or pathological process.

== Method and studies ==
=== Freud's method ===
The conclusion that every dream reveals itself as the fulfillment of a desire derives from Freud's extensive work when he was exploring the unconscious. The method used involves interpreting the content of a large number of dreams in order to uncover the underlying latent meaning and to identify the unconscious desires and conflicts that are causing psychological distress.

Dream analysis usually involves the patient recalling their dreams and describing them to the therapist, who then helps them to identify the symbolic elements and associations in the dream. Particularly, Freud used a method called free association, which involved the patient saying whatever came to mind in response to specific elements of the dream. The therapist would then use this information to uncover the unconscious thoughts and associations that contributed to the symbolism of the dream. It was thus through extensive repetitions of psychoanalysis that Freud was able to develop then verify his hypothesis that the latent content of dreams was often related to unconscious desires or conflicts, and that dreams represented a compromise between these desires and the constraints of waking life.

=== Related studies ===
Succeeding Freud's fundamental work inaugurating the science of dreams, numerous studies have been carried out with the goal of acquiring greater understanding of the function of dreams.

Some studies have shown that dreaming is triggered by engagement of the Mesocortical-Mesolimbic Dopamine system in the Ventromesial quadrant of the frontal lobes, which, according to findings in affective neuroscience, plays a key role in activating motivated behaviour, curiosity and expectations of the external world, that is, the “SEEKING” or “wanting” system.

Other studies have taken a more focused perspective on children's dreams. While supporting Freud’s wish-fulfilling dream theory, they also investigated the distinction between children’s and adults’ dreams, and concluded that the major difference lies in the nature of the underlying wish.

== Debates and criticisms ==
Freud's ideas about dream interpretation have been dropped as counterfactual or untestable by evidence-based psychologists in disciplines such as cognitive psychology. The major objections to Freud's dream theories relate to the fact that he relied heavily on his clinical experiences for his research. Critics have argued that his theories were derived from observations of patients with serious mental problems. Moreover, this theory has also been doubted when considering the existence of dreams associated with negative feelings such as nightmares. Finally, some authors have also argued that dreams in themselves have no psychological meaning or motivational basis, and that dreaming is merely a "random by-product of the REM sleep state". Despite advances in dream science, key questions about the meaning and functions of dreams remain open in dream research and theory.
