= Max Schur =

American physician & psychoanalyst

Max Schur (26 September 1897 – 12 October 1969) was a doctor and friend of Sigmund Freud. He assisted Freud in euthanasia. Ernest Jones considered that "Schur was a perfect choice for a doctor... his considerateness, his untiring patience, and his resourcefulness were unsurpassable".

== Life ==
Schur, who was of Jewish heritage, was born in Stanisławów, Austrian Galicia (present-day Ivano-Frankivsk, Ukraine). He "completed his high school education in Vienna after his family moved there in 1914 to escape the advancing Russian army. After attending medical school at the University of Vienna from 1915 to 1920, he had most of his postgraduate training at the Vienna Poliklinik. He remained there as an associate in internal medicine until he left Vienna in 1938."

After attending Freud's Introductory Lectures, Schur became interested in psychoanalysis, "had a personal analysis with Ruth Mack Brunswick from 1924-32 and was accepted into the Vienna Psychoanalytic Society in 1932. It was this combination of psychoanalytic orientation and internal medicine that led to him becoming Freud's personal physician in 1929."

Schur contributed knowledge to both fields – medicine and psychoanalysis – founded two psychosomatic clinics, and explored the connection between psyche and soma in many of his 37 papers as well as in his book, Freud Living and Dying. Peter Gay considered the latter to be "invaluable for its private revelations and judicious, well-informed judgements".

== Freud ==
During the last decade of Freud's life, "Max Schur established himself as a figure almost as central to Freud as his daughter Anna". Schur followed Freud to London to escape the Nazi Anschluss. At their initial meeting, Freud had asked Schur to '"Promise me also: when the time comes, you won't let them torment me unnecessarily"'. Ten years later, in 1939, as he approached death from cancer, Freud reminded him of his promise, and "Schur pressed his hand and promised he would give him adequate sedation".

"In a period when paternalism was common, Schur modelled, through his treatment of Freud, a modern doctor-patient relationship based on veracity and respect for individual autonomy".

== Affect ==
Schur made "considerable efforts to link the somatic and the psychological aspects of the affects", ultimately producing "a psychosomatic, compromise-formed view of the affects, in line with the trend in ego psychology".

Schur compared ethological and child developmental concepts, as can be seen in his critical discussion of John Bowlby's Grief and Mourning in Infancy (1960). Although rooted in Freud's thinking, Schur argued "firmly for a structured id and ... felt that the idea of the repetition compulsion as a regulatory principle was superfluous". Schur also took issue with Freud's Beyond the Pleasure Principle. Peter Gay wrote that "Schur, whom no one can accuse of reading Freud unsympathetically, said: 'We can assume only that Freud's conclusions...are an example of ad hoc reasoning to prove a preformed hypothesis ... so different from Freud's general scientific style'".

== See also ==
- André Green
- Emma Eckstein

== Sources ==
- Beldoch, Michael. The death of the hero. An essay on Max Schur's Freud: Living and Dying. Bulletin Menninger Clinic, 1974 Nov; 38(6):516–26
- Friend, Maurice R. "Max Schur – 1897–1969," International Journal of Psycho-Analysis, 1971, 52:231–32
- Schur, Max, The id and the regulatory principles of mental functioning, International Universities Press, 1966, ISBN 978-0-8236-2440-9
- Schur, Max, Freud: Living and Dying, International Universities Press, 1972, ISBN 978-0-8236-2025-8
- Mazzarello, Giuseppe Paolo, The Struggle of Dr. Schur, History of Medicine, 2007 ()
