= Gustav Eckstein =

Gustav Eckstein (19 February 1875, Vienna – 27 July 1916, Zurich) was an Austrian social democrat, and associate of Karl Kautsky. Apart from that, Eckstein was also a journalist and scholar.

== Legacy ==
Eckstein is usually remembered today for playing a role in communism. Otto Steiger writes that:

I think that this person could be Gustav Eckstein (1875–1916), socialist (marxian revisionist) and economist. For a broader public he is known as a critic of Rosa Luxemburg's Die Akkumulation des Kapitals. His review of this book has been printed as an appendix in all German editions of Die Akkumulation after Luxembourg's death.
