= Artemis Cooper =

British writer (born 1953)

The Honourable Alice Cooper Lady Beevor
- Born: Alice Clare Antonia Opportune Cooper; 22 April 1953 (age 73)
- Education: French Lycee; Woldingham School; Camden School for Girls
- Alma mater: St Hugh's College, Oxford
- Occupation: Writer
- Spouse: Antony Beevor (m. 1986)
- Children: 2
- Parents: John Julius Norwich (father); Anne Clifford (mother)
- Relatives: Allegra Huston (half-sister)

Artemis Cooper, Lady Beevor FRSL (born the Hon. Alice Clare Antonia Opportune Cooper; 22 April 1953) is a British writer, primarily of biographies. She is married to historian Sir Antony Beevor.

== Family life ==
She is the only daughter of The 2nd Viscount Norwich (better known as John Julius Norwich) and his first wife, Anne (née Clifford), and a paternal granddaughter of Duff and Diana Cooper. She has a brother, the Hon. Jason Charles Duff Bede Cooper, and a half-sister, Allegra Huston, the only child of Lord Norwich and Enrica Soma (then-estranged wife of American film director John Huston).

Cooper attended the French Lycee, the Convent of the Sacred Heart in Woldingham and Camden School for Girls. She then went to St Hugh's College, Oxford and obtained a degree in English language and literature.

She spent time in Egypt with Voluntary Service Overseas teaching English at the University of Alexandria. She has also lived in America, mostly in New Mexico.

In 1986, Artemis Cooper married fellow writer and historian Antony Beevor. The couple have two children, Nella and Adam.

== Writing career ==
Cooper's first book was a collection of the letters of her grandmother, Lady Diana Cooper.

When her biography of Patrick Leigh Fermor appeared in 2012, it was serialised on BBC Radio 4. It was followed in September 2013 by The Broken Road, effectively the third volume of Leigh Fermor's memoir of his walking trip from the Hook of Holland to Istanbul in the 1930s.

== Honours ==
In July 2015, she was awarded an honorary doctorate from the University of York. Cooper was elected a Fellow of the Royal Society of Literature in 2017.

== Bibliography ==
=== Books ===
- Cooper, Artemis, ed. (1983). A Durable Fire: the letters of Duff and Diana Cooper 1913-1950. London: Collins.
  - U.S. edition: Cooper, Artemis, ed. (1984). A Durable Fire: the letters of Duff and Diana Cooper, 1913-1950. New York: Franklin Watts. ISBN 9780531098271
- The Diana Cooper Scrapbook (Hamish Hamilton, 1987) ISBN 9780241121337
- Cairo in the War, 1939-1945 (Hamish Hamilton, 1989; ISBN 0-241-12671-1)
- Watching in the Dark: A Child's Fight for Life (John Murray, 1992; a memoir of her daughter's childhood illness) ISBN 9780719551260
- Writing at the Kitchen Table: The Authorized Biography of Elizabeth David (Penguin Books Ltd, 2004; paperback ed.)
- Paris After the Liberation, 1944-1949 (Hamish Hamilton, 1994; revised Penguin Books, 2007 ISBN 9780142437926; written with her husband, Antony Beevor)
  - Paris despues de la liberación 1944-1949 (Critica, 2004, Spanish translation) ISBN 9789879317747
- Words of Mercury (John Murray, 2003; Patrick Leigh Fermor & Artemis Cooper; ISBN 0-7195-6106-X)
- Patrick Leigh Fermor: An Adventure (John Murray, 2012; ISBN 978-0-7195-5449-0)
- Elizabeth Jane Howard: A Dangerous Innocence (John Murray, 2016, ISBN 9781848549272)

=== Editor ===
- Tango (Thames & Hudson, 1995; ed. Simon Collier, Artemis Cooper, Maria Susana Azzi, and Richard Martin)
- Mr Wu and Mrs Stitch: The Letters of Evelyn Waugh and Diana Cooper (ed. Artemis Cooper)
- Patrick Leigh Fermor. The Broken Road: From the Iron Gates to Mount Athos (ed. Artemis Cooper and Colin Thubron) (John Murray, 2013; ISBN 978-1-848547537)
