= List of awards and nominations received by John Huston =

John Huston awards and nominations
Awards and nominations
| Award | Wins | Nominations |
| Golden Globe | 3 | 8 |
| Academy Awards | 2 | 14 |
| BAFTA Awards | 0 | 1 |

The following is a list of awards and nominations received by John Huston.

John Huston was an American film director, screenwriter, and actor. He received numerous accolades including two Academy Awards and three Golden Globe Awards, as well as a nomination for a BAFTA Award. He also received the BAFTA Fellowship in 1980, a Special Lion for the Overall Work, and a Silver Lion. During his 46-year career, Huston received 14 Academy Award nominations, winning twice.

Huston won two Academy Awards for Best Director and Best Screenplay as well as the Golden Globe Award for Best Director for The Treasure of the Sierra Madre (1948). He earned nominations for The Maltese Falcon (1941), Sargeant York (1941), The Asphalt Jungle (1950), The African Queen (1951), Moulin Rouge (1952), Heaven Knows, Mr. Allison (1957), The Man Who Would Be King (1975), and Prizzi's Honor (1985).

Huston is also known for directing Key Largo (1948), The Misfits (1961), The Night of the Iguana (1964), Fat City (1972), and Annie (1981). Huston acted in numerous films receiving nominations for an Academy Award and a Golden Globe Award for The Cardinal (1963), and Chinatown (1975) respectively. He also acted in Casino Royale (1967), Myra Breckinridge (1970) and Battle for the Planet of the Apes (1973). He voiced Gandolf in The Hobbit (1977).

== Major associations ==
=== Academy Awards ===
| Year | Category | Nominated work | Result | Ref. |
|---|---|---|---|---|
| 1940 | Best Writing, Original Screenplay | Dr. Ehrlich's Magic Bullet | Nominated | |
| 1941 | Best Writing, Screenplay | The Maltese Falcon | Nominated | |
| 1941 | Best Original Screenplay | Sergeant York | Nominated | |
| 1948 | Best Director | The Treasure of the Sierra Madre | Won | |
| 1948 | Best Writing, Screenplay | The Treasure of the Sierra Madre | Won | |
| 1950 | Best Director | The Asphalt Jungle | Nominated | |
| 1950 | Best Writing, Screenplay | The Asphalt Jungle | Nominated | |
| 1951 | Best Director | The African Queen | Nominated | |
| 1951 | Best Writing, Screenplay | The African Queen | Nominated | |
| 1952 | Best Director | Moulin Rouge | Nominated | |
| 1957 | Best Adapted Screenplay | Heaven Knows, Mr. Allison | Nominated | |
| 1963 | Best Supporting Actor | The Cardinal | Nominated | |
| 1975 | Best Adapted Screenplay | The Man Who Would Be King | Nominated | |
| 1985 | Best Director | Prizzi's Honor | Nominated | |

=== BAFTA Awards ===
| Year | Category | Nominated work | Result | Ref. |
|---|---|---|---|---|
| 1975 | Best Supporting Actor | Chinatown | Nominated | |
| 1980 | BAFTA Fellowship | | Won | |

=== Golden Globe Awards ===
| Year | Category | Nominated work | Result | Ref. |
|---|---|---|---|---|
| 1949 | Best Director | The Treasure of the Sierra Madre | Won | |
| 1951 | Best Director | The Asphalt Jungle | Nominated | |
| 1951 | Best Screenplay | The Asphalt Jungle | Nominated | |
| 1963 | Best Director | Freud | Nominated | |
| 1964 | Best Supporting Actor | The Cardinal | Won | |
| 1965 | Best Director | The Night of the Iguana | Nominated | |
| 1975 | Best Supporting Actor | Chinatown | Nominated | |
| 1986 | Best Director | Prizzi's Honor | Won | |

=== Independent Spirit Awards ===
| Year | Category | Nominated work | Result | Ref. |
|---|---|---|---|---|
| 1988 | Best Director | The Dead | Won | |

== Critics awards ==
| Year | Association | Category | Nominated work | Result | Ref. |
|---|---|---|---|---|---|
| 1948 | New York Film Critics Circle | Best Director | The Treasure of the Sierra Madre | Won | |
| 1948 | National Board of Review | Best Screenplay | The Treasure of the Sierra Madre | Won | |
| 1950 | New York Film Critics Circle | Best Director | The Asphalt Jungle | Nominated | |
| 1950 | National Board of Review | Best Director | The Asphalt Jungle | Won | |
| 1952 | New York Film Critics Circle | Best Director | The African Queen | Nominated | |
| 1956 | New York Film Critics Circle | Best Director | Moby Dick | Won | |
| 1956 | New York Film Critics Circle | Best Screenplay | Moby Dick | Nominated | |
| 1956 | National Board of Review | Best Director | Moby Dick | Won | |
| 1974 | Kansas City Film Critics Circle | Chinatown | Best Supporting Actor | Won | |
| 1979 | Los Angeles Film Critics Association | Career Achievement Award | | Won | |
| 1984 | National Board of Review | Career Achievement Award | | Won | |
| 1985 | New York Film Critics Circle | Best Director | Prizzi's Honor | Won | |
| 1986 | Boston Society of Film Critics | Best Director | Prizzi's Honor | Won | |
| 1986 | National Society of Film Critics | Best Director | Prizzi's Honor | Won | |
| 1987 | New York Film Critics Circle | Best Director | The Dead | Nominated | |
| 1988 | National Society of Film Critics | Best Director | The Dead | Nominated | |
| 1989 | French Syndicate of Cinema Critics | Best Foreign Film | The Dead | Won | |
| 1989 | London Film Critics' Circle | Director of the Year | The Dead | Won | |

== Film festivals ==
| Year | Association | Category | Nominated work | Result | Ref. |
|---|---|---|---|---|---|
| 1948 | Venice Film Festival | Golden Lion | The Treasure of the Sierra Madre | Nominated | |
| 1950 | Venice Film Festival | Golden Lion | The Asphalt Jungle | Nominated | |
| 1953 | Venice Film Festival | Golden Lion | Moulin Rouge | Nominated | |
| 1953 | Venice Film Festival | Silver Lion | Moulin Rouge | Won | |
| 1963 | Berlin International Film Festival | Golden Bear | Freud | Nominated | |
| 1979 | Chicago International Film Festival | Gold Hugo | Wise Blood | Nominated | |
| 1979 | San Sebastián International Film Festival | Golden Shell | Wise Blood | Nominated | |
| 1981 | Moscow International Film Festival | Golden Prize | Victory | Nominated | |
| 1984 | Cannes Film Festival | Palme d’Or | Under the Volcano | Nominated | |
| 1985 | Venice Film Festival | Golden Lion | Prizzi's Honor | Nominated | |
| 1985 | Venice Film Festival | Golden Ciak | Prizzi's Honor | Won | |
| 1985 | Venice Film Festival | Special Lion for the Overall Work | | Won | |
| 1987 | Tokyo International Film Festival | Tokyo Grand Prix | The Dead | Nominated | |
| 1987 | Tokyo International Film Festival | Special Achievement Award | The Dead | Won | |

== Guild awards ==
| Year | Guild | Category | Nominated work | Result | Ref. |
|---|---|---|---|---|---|
| 1949 | Writers Guild of America | Best Written American Drama | The Treasure of the Sierra Madre | Nominated | |
| 1949 | Writers Guild of America | Best Written Western | The Treasure of the Sierra Madre | Won | |
| 1949 | Writers Guild of America | Best Written American Drama | Key Largo | Nominated | |
| 1951 | Directors Guild of America | Outstanding Directorial Achievement in Motion Pictures | The Asphalt Jungle | Nominated | |
| 1951 | Writers Guild of America | The Robert Meltzer Award | The Asphalt Jungle | Nominated | |
| 1951 | Writers Guild of America | Best Written American Drama | The Asphalt Jungle | Nominated | |
| 1953 | Writers Guild of America | Moulin Rouge | Best Written Drama | Nominated | |
| 1957 | Directors Guild of America | Outstanding Directorial Achievement in Motion Pictures | Moby Dick | Nominated | |
| 1958 | Directors Guild of America | Outstanding Directorial Achievement in Motion Pictures | Heaven Knows, Mr. Allison | Nominated | |
| 1958 | Writers Guild of America | Best Written Drama | Heaven Knows, Mr. Allison | Nominated | |
| 1962 | Directors Guild of America | Outstanding Directorial Achievement in Motion Pictures | The Misfits | Nominated | |
| 1963 | Directors Guild of America | Outstanding Directorial Achievement in Motion Pictures | Freud | Nominated | |
| 1964 | Writers Guild of America | Laurel Award for Screenwriting Achievement | | Won | |
| 1965 | Directors Guild of America | Outstanding Directorial Achievement in Motion Pictures | The Night of the Iguana | Nominated | |
| 1965 | Writers Guild of America | Best Written Drama | The Night of the Iguana | Nominated | |
| 1976 | Writers Guild of America | Best Drama Adapted from Another Medium | The Man Who Would Be King | Nominated | |
| 1983 | Directors Guild of America | Lifetime Achievement Award – Feature Film | | Won | |
| 1986 | Directors Guild of America | Outstanding Directorial Achievement in Motion Pictures | Prizzi's Honor | Nominated | |

== Miscellaneous awards ==
| Year | Association | Category | Nominated work | Result | Ref. |
|---|---|---|---|---|---|
| 1957 | Italian National Syndicate of Film Journalists | Best Foreign Film | Moby Dick | Won | |
| 1966 | Accademia del Cinema Italiano | Best Foreign Director | The Bible | Won | |
| 1979 | The Recording Academy | Best Recording for Children | The Hobbit | Nominated | |
| 1981 | Society of Camera Operators | Governors' Award | | Won | |
| 1983 | Golden Raspberry Award Foundation | Worst Director | Annie | Nominated | |
| 1983 | American Film Institute | Life Achievement Award | | Won | |
| 1986 | Italian National Syndicate of Film Journalists | Best Foreign Director | Prizzi's Honor | Nominated | |
| 1986 | Accademia del Cinema Italiano | Best Foreign Director | Prizzi's Honor | Nominated | |
| 1988 | Cahiers du Cinéma | Annual Top 10 Lists | The Dead | 3rd Place | |
| 1988 | Accademia del Cinema Italiano | Best Foreign Director | The Dead | Nominated | |
| 1988 | Accademia del Cinema Italiano | Best Foreign Film | The Dead | Nominated | |
| 1989 | Bodil Awards | Bodil Award for Best Non-European Film | The Dead | Won | |

== Direction for Oscar-related performances ==
| Year | Performer | Feature | Result |
|---|---|---|---|
Academy Award for Best Actor
| 1952 | Humphrey Bogart | The African Queen | Won |
| 1953 | José Ferrer | Moulin Rouge | Nominated |
| 1985 | Albert Finney | Under the Volcano | Nominated |
| 1986 | Jack Nicholson | Prizzi's Honor | Nominated |
Academy Award for Best Actress
| 1952 | Katharine Hepburn | The African Queen | Nominated |
| 1958 | Deborah Kerr | Heaven Knows, Mr. Allison | Nominated |
Academy Award for Best Supporting Actor
| 1942 | Sydney Greenstreet | The Maltese Falcon | Nominated |
| 1949 | Walter Huston | The Treasure of the Sierra Madre | Won |
| 1951 | Sam Jaffe | The Asphalt Jungle | Nominated |
| 1986 | William Hickey | Prizzi's Honor | Nominated |
Academy Award for Best Supporting Actress
| 1949 | Claire Trevor | Key Largo | Won |
| 1953 | Colette Marchand | Moulin Rouge | Nominated |
| 1965 | Grayson Hall | The Night of the Iguana | Nominated |
| 1973 | Susan Tyrell | Fat City | Nominated |
| 1986 | Anjelica Huston | Prizzi's Honor | Won |
