= Jack Huston =

English actor

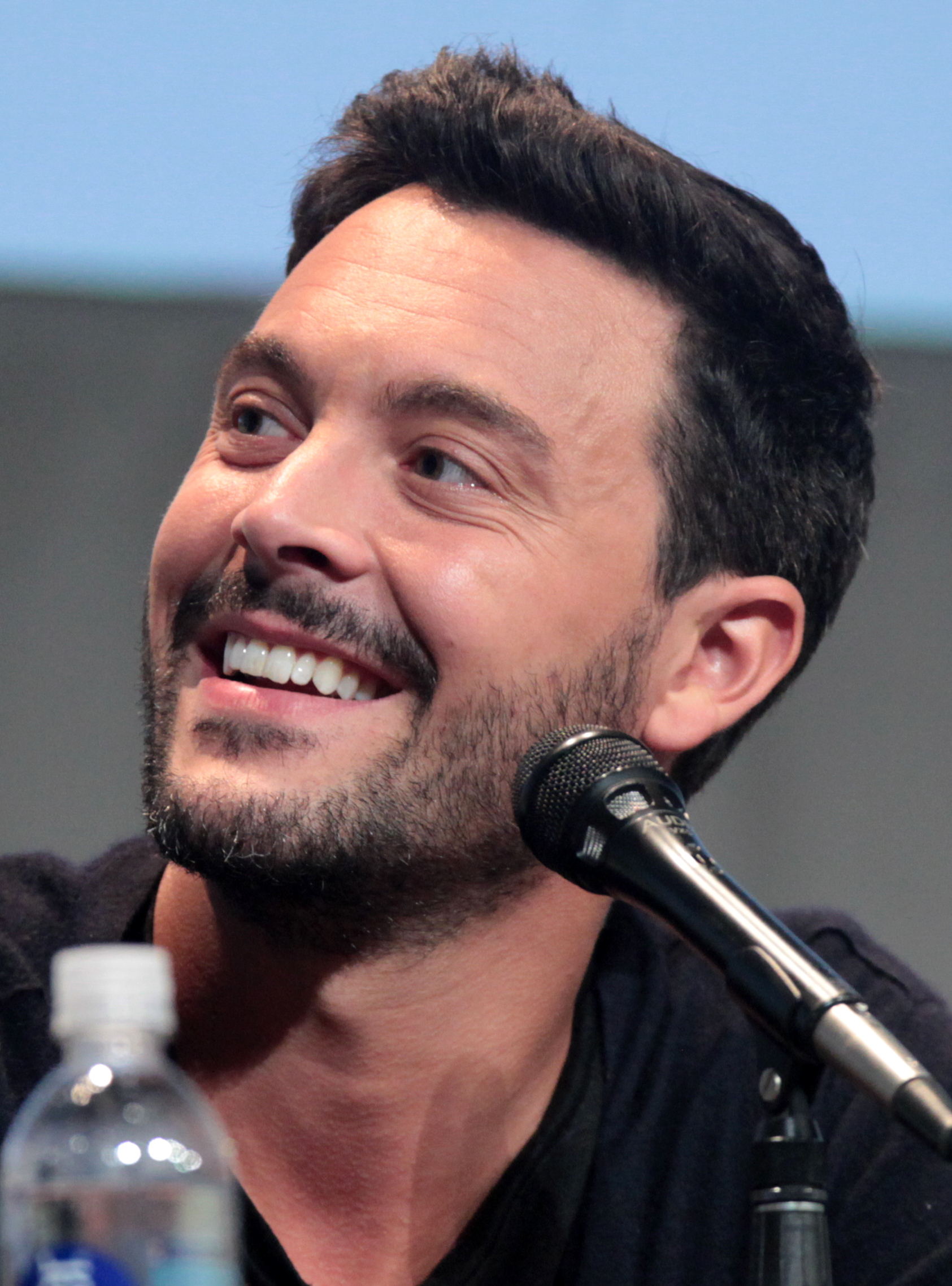
- Huston at the 2015 Comic-Con International
- Born: Jack Alexander Huston; 7 December 1982 (age 43); King's Lynn, Norfolk, England
- Occupation: Actor
- Years active: 2004–present
- Spouse: Shannan Click (m. 2022)
- Children: 2
- Parent: Tony Huston (father)
- Relatives: Walter Huston (great-grandfather); John Huston (grandfather); Hugh Cholmondeley (grandfather); Anjelica Huston (aunt); Allegra Huston (aunt); Danny Huston (uncle); David Cholmondeley (uncle); Miranda Raison (cousin)

Jack Alexander Huston (born 7 December 1982) is an English actor and director. He is best known for his role as Richard Harrow in the HBO television drama series Boardwalk Empire. He also had a supporting role in the 2013 film American Hustle, portrayed the eponymous Ben-Hur in the 2016 historical drama, and appeared as one of the main characters in the fourth season of the FX anthology series Fargo (2020). In 2023, he starred in the supernatural television series Mayfair Witches.

== Early life and ancestry ==
Huston was born on 7 December 1982 in King's Lynn, Norfolk, the son of Lady Margot Lavinia (née Cholmondeley) and actor, assistant director and writer Tony Huston. Huston decided to become an actor at the age of 6, after playing the title role in a school production of Peter Pan. He later attended Hurtwood House, a drama institute.

His mother is English and his father is American. His paternal aunt is Anjelica Huston, and his paternal half-uncle is Danny Huston. His paternal grandparents were American director John Huston (who became an Irish citizen) and model/dancer Enrica Soma, and his maternal grandparents were The 6th Marquess of Cholmondeley and Lavinia Margaret (née Leslie). Huston is the nephew of The 7th Marquess of Cholmondeley. On his father's side, he has Italian, Irish, Scottish, Scotch-Irish, Welsh, and English ancestry, and is a great-grandson of Canadian actor Walter Huston.

Through his maternal grandfather's father, The 5th Marquess of Cholmondeley, Huston is descended from Sir Robert Walpole, the first Prime Minister of the Kingdom of Great Britain. Huston's maternal grandfather's mother, Sybil, Marchioness of Cholmondeley, was from a Jewish family (from Iraq, India, and Germany); through Sybil, Huston is descended from both David Sassoon, the Treasurer of Baghdad, and Mayer Amschel Rothschild, who founded the Rothschild family international banking dynasty.

== Career ==
Huston started his film career with a small screen adaptation of Spartacus, where he played Flavius. He then went on to having more prominent roles in such films as Factory Girl, playing the American poet Gerard Malanga, the horror film Shrooms, Outlander and Shrink.

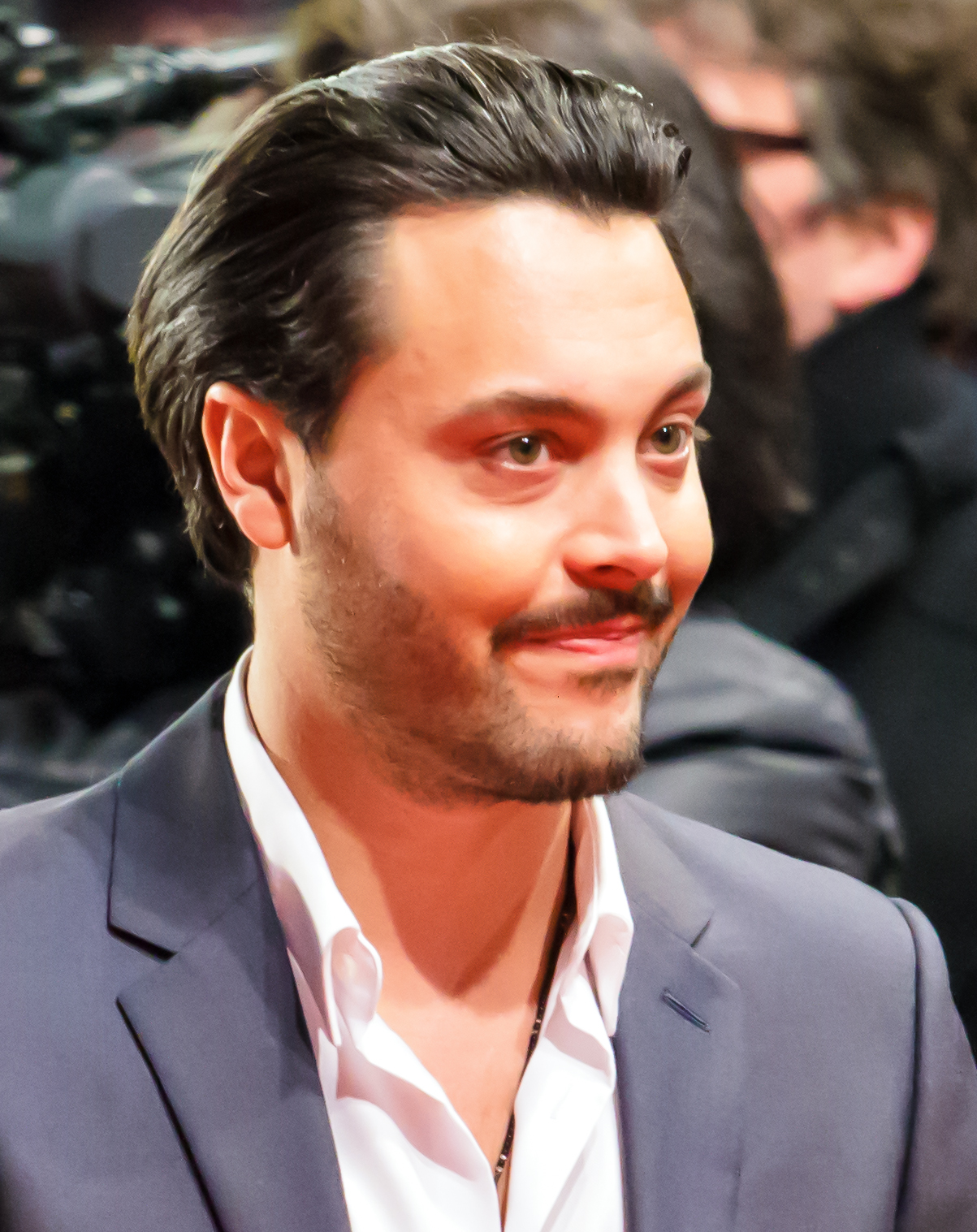
Jack Huston at the Berlin International Film Festival in 2013

In 2010, he played the minor role of Royce King in The Twilight Saga: Eclipse. He appeared in HBO's Boardwalk Empire as Richard Harrow, a severely disfigured World War I marksman turned gangster. On 16 December 2010, it was announced Huston would be made a series regular after appearing in five episodes of the first season.

After this he went on to be directed by Al Pacino in the 2011 film Wilde Salomé and to having starring roles in Not Fade Away, Two Jacks and Night Train to Lisbon. In 2012, he played the part of narrator on avant-garde musician John Zorn's album A Vision in Blakelight, an homage to William Blake.

In 2013, he appeared in David O. Russell's comedy-drama American Hustle, as Pete Musane. Later that year, Huston played Charles Bruno in Strangers on a Train at London's Gielgud Theatre. In 2015 he appeared as Ira Levinson in Nicholas Sparks' The Longest Ride. In 2019 Huston played Bobby Kennedy in the Martin Scorsese film The Irishman.

In 2020, he had a supporting role in the fourth season of the FX black comedy crime drama Fargo as Odis Weff, a corrupt Kansas City police detective with severe OCD.

In 2023, Huston made his directorial debut with Day of the Fight, starring Michael Pitt as a once renowned boxer who has since fallen on hard times. The film had its premiere out of competition in the Orizzonti Extra section of the 80th Venice International Film Festival.

In September 2024, he was cast as Flint Marko / Sandman on the superhero series Spider-Noir.

In March 2025, Huston was announced as the director of Joseph Merrick, a feature film from Phoenix Pictures about the historical figure known as the Elephant Man. Scheduled to begin production in 2025, the film will focus on Merrick’s final months, exploring his personal journey and the relationships he formed. The producers of the film are Kate Cohen, Mike Medavoy, David Dobkin, and Huston, with additional executive producers attached.

== Personal life ==
Huston began dating American model Shannan Click in 2011; the two married in Las Vegas in March 2022. They have two children: a daughter and a son.

== Filmography ==
=== Film ===
Year	Title	Role	Notes
2005	Neighborhood Watch	Bob	
2006	Factory Girl	Gerard Malanga	
2007	Shrooms	Jake	
2008	Outlander	Wulfric	
2008	The Garden of Eden	David Bourne	
2009	Shrink	Shamus	
2009	Boogie Woogie	Joe	
2010	Mr. Nice	Graham Plinson	
2010	The Twilight Saga: Eclipse	Royce King II	
2011	Wilde Salome	Lord Alfred	
2012	The Hot Potato	Danny	
2012	Two Jacks	Jack Hussar Junior	
2012	Not Fade Away	Eugene Gaunt	
2013	Kill Your Darlings	Jack Kerouac	
2013	Night Train to Lisbon	Amadeu	
2013	American Hustle	Pete Musane	Alliance of Women Film Journalists Award for Best Ensemble Cast; Broadcast Film Critics Association Award for Best Cast; Detroit Film Critics Society Award for Best Ensemble; New York Film Critics Circle Award for Best Ensemble Cast; Phoenix Film Critics Society Award for Best Cast; Screen Actors Guild Award for Outstanding Performance by a Cast in a Motion Picture; San Diego Film Critics Society Award for Best Performance by an Ensemble; Nominated – Washington D.C. Area Film Critics Association Award for Best Ensemble
2014	Posthumous	Liam Price	
2015	The Longest Ride	Young Ira Levinson	
2016	Pride and Prejudice and Zombies	George Wickham	
2016	Hail, Caesar!	Cad in Cab	
2016	Ben-Hur	Judah Ben-Hur	
2016	Past Forward	Man #2	Short film
2016	Their Finest	Ellis Cole	
2017	The Yellow Birds	Sergeant Sterling	
2018	An Actor Prepares	Adam	
2019	Above Suspicion	Mark Putnam	
2019	The Irishman	Robert F. Kennedy	
2019	Earthquake Bird	Bob	
2020	Antebellum	Captain Jasper	
2021	House of Gucci	Domenico De Sole	Nominated – Screen Actors Guild Award for Outstanding Performance by a Cast in a Motion Picture
2022	Savage Salvation	Shelby John	
2023	Day of the Fight	—N/a	Director, writer, and producer
2023	Hail Mary	Baal	
2024	Unit 234	Clayton	
2025	I'm Beginning to See the Light	Ezra Cooper	
2026	The Basics of Philosophy	Dr. John Jorrisen	Premiere at 83rd Venice International Film Festival

=== Television ===
Year	Title	Role	Notes
2004	Spartacus	Flavius	Television film
2008	Miss Austen Regrets	Dr. Charles Haden	Television film
2009–2010	Eastwick	Jamie	8 episodes
2010–2013	Boardwalk Empire	Richard Harrow	33 episodes Screen Actors Guild Award for Outstanding Performance by an Ensemble in a Drama Series (2012); Nominated – Screen Actors Guild Award for Outstanding Performance by an Ensemble in a Drama Series (2013–2014)
2012	Parade's End	Gerald	3 episodes
2012	Tron: Uprising	Rasket (voice)	Episode: "Tagged"
2014	The Great Fire	King Charles II of England	4 episodes
2018	Mr. Mercedes	Felix Babineau	9 episodes
2018	The Romanoffs	Samuel Ryan	Episode: "House of Special Purpose"
2020	Manhunt: Deadly Games	Eric Rudolph	7 episodes
2020	Fargo	Odis Weff	8 episodes
2023–present	Mayfair Witches	Lasher	16 episodes
2024	Expats	David Starr	6 episodes
2026	Spider-Noir	Flint Marko / Sandman	8 episodes
