= Tony Huston =

American screenwriter

- Born: Walter Anthony Huston; April 16, 1950 (age 76); Los Angeles County, California, U.S.
- Occupations: Screenwriter; actor
- Spouse: Lady Margot Cholmondeley (m. 1978, divorced)
- Children: 3, including Jack Huston
- Parent(s): John Huston; Enrica Soma
- Relatives: Anjelica Huston (sister); Allegra Huston (sister); Danny Huston (paternal half-brother)

Walter Anthony Huston (born April 16, 1950) is an American screenwriter and actor.

== Biography ==
Born April 16, 1950 in Los Angeles County, California, the son of director John Huston, and his fourth wife Enrica Soma. At birth, was named after paternal grandfather actor Walter Huston, who died just nine days earlier.

His siblings include Anjelica, Allegra and Danny Huston.

Unlike other members of his family, who went into acting, Huston specialized in writing screenplays. He is best known for his work on The Dead (1987), for which he was nominated for an Academy Award for Best Adapted Screenplay. He is also listed as an assistant director on one film, The Hellcats (1968), which he also co-wrote, and director on the 1971 film Outlaw Riders. He later became an attorney.

On 18 November 1978, he married Lady Margot Cholmondeley, the daughter of the 6th Marquess of Cholmondeley, with whom he had three children, including Jack Huston. Huston and Margot later divorced.

== Accolades ==
Award	Category	Title	Result	Ref(s)
Academy Awards	Best Adapted Screenplay	The Dead (1987)	Nominated	
Independent Spirit Awards	Best Screenplay	The Dead (1987)	Nominated	
New York Film Critics Circle	Best Screenplay (2nd place)	The Dead (1987)	Nominated	
USC Scripter Award		The Dead (1987)	Nominated	

== Filmography ==
- The List of Adrian Messenger (1963) (Derek Bruttenholm) (as Walter Anthony Huston)
- The Eye Creatures (1967) (Culver's sergeant) (as Tony Houston)
- Zontar, the Thing from Venus (1967) (Keith Ritchie) (as Anthony Houston)
- Sam (as Anthony Houston)
- Curse of the Swamp Creature (1968) (Tom) (as Tony Houston)
- Mars Needs Women (1968) (Martian fellow #3) (as Anthony Houston)
- Comanche Crossing (1968)
- Apple's Way (1974) (man/man at perfume counter)
- The Runaways (1975) (marine driver)
- The Dead (1987) (screenwriter; nominated for an Academy Award)
