= Comanche Crossing =

1968 film

- Directed by: Larry Buchanan
- Written by: Larry Buchanan; Tony Huston
- Produced by: Larry Buchanan
- Starring: Cynthia Hull
- Release date: 1968
- Country: United States
- Language: English

Comanche Crossing is a 1968 Western film directed by Larry Buchanan. Buchanan worked on the film in 1967–68 with Tony Huston. It was shot in Big Bend Country near the US-Mexican border, with Cynthia Hull as a Native American and Huston as a Comanche warrior. The film was never released.

Buchanan says it was one of his more personal projects that he made between exploitation pictures; he later called it "a fine little film".

== Cast ==
- Cynthia Hull
- Tony Huston
- Caruth C. Byrd

== Production ==
The film was financed by Caruth C. Byrd who helped finance several other movies from Buchanan, including Sam.
