= Fat City (novel) =

1969 novel by Leonard Gardner

- Author: Leonard Gardner
- Language: English
- Genre: Sports novel Tragedy
- Publisher: Farrar, Straus & Giroux
- Publication date: 1969
- Publication place: United States
- Media type: Print (Hardback & Paperback)
- Pages: 183 pp (Hardback first edition)

Fat City is a novel by American writer Leonard Gardner published in 1969. His only novel, its prestige has grown since its publication, due to critical acclaim from Joan Didion and Walker Percy, among others. Denis Johnson cites it as a major influence on his writing. The book is widely considered a classic of boxing fiction.

== Plot summary ==
Twenty-nine year old semi-retired boxer Billy Tully is discouraged not only by his defeat to another lightweight fighter in Panama, but also from the desertion of his wife two years earlier. In the small-time boxing circuit of Stockton, California, in the late 1950s, Tully meets and spars with novice fighter Ernie Munger at the local YMCA. Remarking on his talent, Tully suggests Munger visit Tully's former trainer, Ruben Luna.

Disgusted by his lack of fitness and power, Tully entertains the idea of returning to the ring in a bid to reclaim his self-respect and possibly his ex-wife. Munger gets his girlfriend, Faye, pregnant and marries her out of obligation, vowing to support his young family through the ring. After losing his first amateur bout he has some success and, despite his anxieties about marriage, seems poised to ascend the circuit ranks. Tully, meanwhile is wracked by uncertainty and divides his time between working as a low-paying crop picker and drinking heavily in seedy bars and motels. Directionless, he drifts between different hotels, behind on his bills and being a disruption. After a brief affair with an alcoholic barfly named Oma, Tully strengthens his resolve and makes a concerted effort to prepare for a fight against a moderately well-known but aging Mexican fighter, Arcadio Lucero.

Tully ekes out a win on a bill that Munger appeared below him on the undercard, successful in his professional debut. Though momentarily bolstered by his victory, Tully pines for the companionship of any woman, realizing that his career is over and the past can not be reclaimed. He quarrels with Luna over his limited cut of the fight's purse, dismissing that Luna had merely recouped advances given to him, and is bitter and recriminating with Luna over a perceived lack of support in his last fight. Alone and without any future prospects, he descends into an abyss, becoming just another unshaven drunk at the bar lost in the haze of his past. Munger continues to fight and, hitchhiking home alone from a bout in Salt Lake City, Utah, he is picked up by two young women who abandon him on a stretch of empty highway in the dark of night over an awkward exchange revealing his lustful longings.

== Meaning of title ==
In a 1969 interview with Life, Gardner explained the meaning of the title.

"Lots of people have asked me about the title of my book. It's part of Negro slang. When you say you want to go to Fat City, it means you want the good life. I got the idea for the title after seeing a photograph of a tenement in an exhibit in San Francisco. 'Fat City' was scrawled in chalk on a wall. The title is ironic: Fat City is a crazy goal no one is ever going to reach."

== Critical reception ==
Kirkus Reviews wrote that Leonard "takes the tired saga of the second rate fighter and converts it into a vivid, gritty experience underlying the ultimate sadness of constricted, caught, despairing lives."

== Influence ==
American writer Joan Didion said that "Fat City affected me more than any new fiction I have read in a long while, and I do not think it affected me only because I come from Fat City, or somewhere near it... He has got it exactly right... but he has done more than just get it down, he has made it a metaphor for the joyless in heart."

Of the novel, Denis Johnson has stated that "I studied Leonard Gardner's book so closely that I began to fear I'd never be able to write anything but imitations of it, so I swore it off" and that ten years later its influence was still strong: "I'd taught myself to write in Gardner's style, though not as well". Johnson's book Jesus' Son has been compared to Fat City in both its content and style.

== Film adaptation ==
The novel was adapted into a film of the same name by John Huston in 1972.
