= Al Silvani =

American actor

- Born: April 26, 1910
- Died: January 10, 1996 (aged 85); North Hollywood, Los Angeles, California, U.S.
- Occupations: Boxing trainer, actor

Al Silvani (April 26, 1910 – January 10, 1996) was an American boxing trainer and actor.

As one of the most sought-after trainers in the business, Silvani trained over twenty world champions, including Jake LaMotta, Henry Armstrong, Carmen Basilio, Fritzie Zivic, Pone Kingpetch, Rocky Graziano, Ingemar Johansson, and Lou Ambers.

He also had a lengthy career in the film industry as an actor, stunt man, and as a technical advisor—most noteworthy a lead role in Robin and the Seven Hoods. He also appeared in From Here to Eternity, Ocean's 11, Stir Crazy, Every Which Way But Loose, The Gauntlet, Rocky, Rocky II and Rocky III.

He was a close personal friend of Frank Sinatra and hung out with Sinatra's Rat Pack.

Inducted into the World Boxing Hall of Fame.

2006 California Boxing Hall of Fame Inductee.

== Fighters trained ==
- Cisco Andrade
- Alexis Argüello
- Billy Backus
- Nino Benvenuti (Late in his Career 1968–71)
- Tom Bogs
- Mustafa Hamsho (For second Hagler fight)
- Eddie Machen
- Tami Mauriello
- Buster Mathis
- Floyd Patterson (Later in his Career)
- Al Tribuani
- Cleveland Williams
- Robert De Niro (for his role in Raging Bull)

== Death ==
Silvani died in the North Hollywood section of Los Angeles in 1996.

== Filmography ==
Year	Title	Role	Notes
1953	From Here to Eternity	Soldier Leaving New Congress Club	Uncredited
1956	Somebody Up There Likes Me	Rocky's Second	Uncredited
1958	Tempestade	Pope Gerasim	
1959	Al Capone	Waiter	Uncredited
1959	The Gene Krupa Story	Man Rubbing Krupa's Shoulders	Uncredited
1960	Ocean's 11	Burlesque Club Manager	Uncredited
1960	Let No Man Write My Epitaph	Bit Role	Uncredited
1961	The Young Savages	Dention Center Guard	Uncredited
1962	Kid Galahad	Training Camp Spectator	Uncredited
1963	Come Blow Your Horn	Bell-Hop	Uncredited
1964	Robin and the 7 Hoods	Robbo's Hood #4	
1965	Von Ryan's Express	American P.O.W. at Train Station	Uncredited
1965	Marriage on the Rocks	Mexican Character	Uncredited
1972	Fat City	Referee at Tully-Lucero Fight	Uncredited
1973	The All-American Boy	Referee	Uncredited
1975	The Black Bird	Bartender	
1976	Rocky	Cut Man	
1977	Bobby Deerfield	Mechanic	
1977	The Gauntlet	Police Sergeant	
1978	Every Which Way But Loose	Tank Murdock's Manager	
1979	Rocky II	Cutman	
1980	Stir Crazy	Inmate	Uncredited
1982	Rocky III	Al	
