= Somebody Up There Likes Me (1956 film) =

1956 film by Robert Wise

- Theatrical release poster
- Directed by: Robert Wise
- Screenplay by: Ernest Lehman
- Based on: Somebody Up There Likes Me (1955 autobiography) by Rocky Graziano; Rowland Barber
- Produced by: Charles Schnee
- Starring: Paul Newman; Pier Angeli; Everett Sloane; Eileen Heckart; Sal Mineo
- Cinematography: Joseph Ruttenberg
- Edited by: Albert Akst
- Music by: Bronislau Kaper
- Production company: Metro-Goldwyn-Mayer
- Distributed by: Lowe's Inc.
- Release date: July 3, 1956
- Running time: 114 minutes
- Country: United States
- Language: English
- Budget: $1.92 million
- Box office: $3.36 million

Somebody Up There Likes Me is a 1956 American biographical sports drama film directed by Robert Wise, adapted by Ernest Lehman from the 1955 autobiography of middleweight boxing legend Rocky Graziano. It stars Paul Newman as Graziano, along with Pier Angeli, Everett Sloane, Eileen Heckart, Harold J. Stone, and Sal Mineo.

The film was released by MGM on July 3, 1956. It received positive reviews from critics and was a commercial success. At the 29th Academy Awards, the film won Oscars for Best Cinematography (Black and White) and Best Art Direction (Black and White).

== Plot ==
Rocky Graziano has a difficult childhood and is beaten by his father. He joins a street gang, and undergoes a long history of criminal activities. He is sent to prison, where he is rebellious to all authority figures. After his release, he is drafted by the U.S. Army, but runs away. Needing money, he becomes a boxer, and finds that he has natural talent and wins six fights in a row before the Army finds him and dishonorably discharges him. He serves a year in a United States Disciplinary Barracks, and resumes his career as a boxer as a result.

While working his way to the title, he is introduced to his sister's friend Norma, whom he falls in love with and later marries. Starting a new, clean life, he rises to the top, but loses a title fight with Tony Zale. A person he knew in prison finds him and blackmails him into throwing a fight over his dishonorable discharge. Rocky fakes an injury and avoids the fight altogether. When he is interrogated by the district attorney, he refuses to name the blackmailer and has his license suspended. His manager gets him a fight in Chicago to fight Zale, the middleweight champion, once more. Rocky wins the fight.

== Cast ==
- Paul Newman as Rocky Graziano
- Pier Angeli as Norma Graziano
- Everett Sloane as Irving Cohen
- Eileen Heckart as Ida Barbella
- Sal Mineo as Romolo
- Harold J. Stone as Nick Barbella
- Joseph Buloff as Benny
- Sammy White as Whitey Bimstein
- Arch Johnson as Heldon
- Robert Lieb as District Attorney Frank Hogan
- Theodore Newton as Commissioner Eddie Eagan

Uncredited

- Court Shepard as Tony Zale
- Steve McQueen as Fidel
- Robert Loggia as Frankie Pepo
- Michael Dante as Shorty "the Greek"
- Angela Cartwright as Audrey
- Al Silvani as Cornerman
- Dean Jones as Army Private
- George C. Scott as Prisoner

== Production ==
=== Casting ===
The film is notable for being one of Paul Newman's first starring roles. This also marked the film debuts of Eileen Heckart (as Graziano's mother, Ida), Dean Jones, George C. Scott, Robert Loggia, Frank Campanella, and Angela Cartwright. It was also the second-ever film role of Steve McQueen.

The role of Rocky Graziano was originally to be played by James Dean, but he died before filming began, and Newman was asked to take the part. Australian actor Rod Taylor was also considered for the part; although unsuccessful, his screen test impressed MGM enough for them to offer him a long-term contract. Dewey Martin and Dean Martin had both also been considered. In preparation for his role, Paul Newman interviewed the real Graziano several times, and trained with his real former trainer Al Silvani (who cameos as a cornerman in the film).

Sam Levene was originally attached to play Graziano's manager Irving Cohen, but he was replaced by Everett Sloane. Jack Dempsey was announced to appear in the film as himself, but he does not appear in the final film.

=== Filming ===
MGM originally wanted to shoot most of the film in color on studio sets in Los Angeles, but Robert Wise felt they were unconvincing and only used them for night scenes, taking a budget cut to shoot the film in black-and-white in the process. Location filming took place in New York City, in Manhattan's Lower East Side and Brooklyn. Several scenes were shot at Stillman's Gym. The Yankee Stadium fights were filmed at the Grand Olympic Auditorium in Los Angeles.

== Soundtrack ==
Perry Como's version of the title song is played over the opening and closing credits.

== Reception ==
=== Box office ===
According to MGM records, the film earned $1,915,000 in the US and Canada and $1,445,000 elsewhere, resulting in a profit of $609,000.

=== Critical response ===
The casting of blond-haired Midwesterner Newman, whose only prior film role was in the poorly-received The Silver Chalice, as the dark-haired New Yorker Graziano had been treated skeptically in the lead-up to the film's release. However, Newman's performance was generally well-received, with several contemporary reviews likening him to Marlon Brando, and the film helped launch his career as a film star.

On the review aggregator website Rotten Tomatoes, the film has an approval rating of 86% based on 14 reviews, with an average rating of 6.6/10.

=== Awards and nominations ===
| Institution | Year | Category | Nominee(s) | Result |
|---|---|---|---|---|
| Academy Awards | 1956 | Best Cinematography (Black and White) | Joseph Ruttenberg | Won |
| Academy Awards | 1956 | Best Film Editing | Albert Akst | Nominated |
| Academy Awards | 1956 | Best Art Direction (Black and White) | Cedric Gibbons, Malcolm Brown, Edwin B. Willis, F. Keogh Gleason | Won |
| Circle of Cinematographic Writers | 1962 | Best Foreign Actor | Paul Newman | Won |
| Directors Guild of America | 1957 | Outstanding Directorial Achievement in Theatrical Feature Film | Robert Wise | Nominated |
| National Board of Review | 1956 | Top Ten Films | —N/a | 6th place |
| New York Film Critics Circle | 1956 | Best Screenplay | Ernest Lehman | Nominated |
| Photoplay | 1956 | Favorite Picture of the Year | —N/a | Nominated |
| Writers Guild of America | 1957 | Best Written American Drama | Ernest Lehman | Nominated |

== See also ==
- List of American films of 1956
- List of boxing films
- List of hood films
