= Nicolette Robinson =

American actress (born 1988)

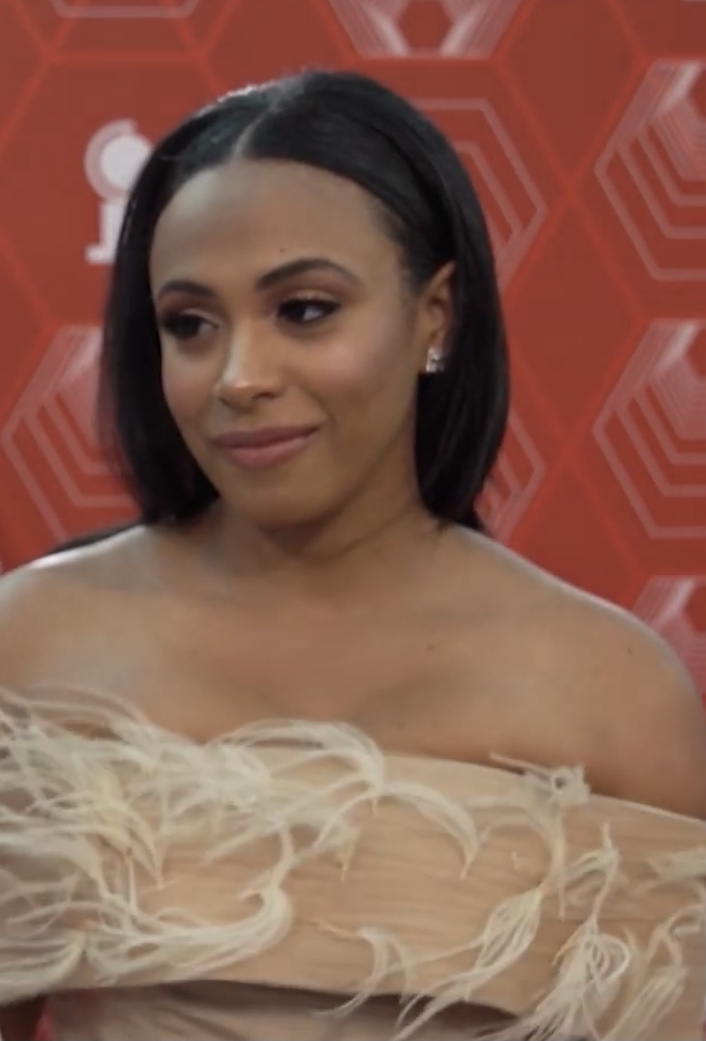
- Robinson at the 74th Tony Awards in 2021
- Born: April 18, 1988 (age 38); Los Angeles, California, U.S.
- Education: University of California, Los Angeles
- Occupations: Actress, singer
- Years active: 1996–present
- Spouse: Leslie Odom Jr. (m. 2012)
- Children: 2

Nicolette Kloe Robinson (born April 18, 1988) is an American actress. She is known for her role as Jane in the television show The Affair and Jenna in the stage musical Waitress, the latter of which marked her Broadway debut.

== Early life ==
Robinson was born on April 18, 1988, in Los Angeles, California, to a Jewish mother and an African-American father. She has joked that her family "looks like the U.N." She attended the University of California, Los Angeles, where Robinson majored in musical theater. While in school she performed in multiple stage productions and UCLA's Awaken A Cappella and received the Gant Gaither Theater Award from the Princess Grace Foundation-USA. Robinson also received a scholarship from the Jackie Robinson Foundation.

== Personal life ==
In 2012, Robinson married actor Leslie Odom Jr., whom she met in 2008 while auditioning for a role in the musical Once on This Island in Los Angeles. Odom, who would later become known for originating the role of Aaron Burr in the stage musical Hamilton, served as the assistant director of Once on This Island. As Robinson would be replacing an actress who had left the production, Odom was tasked with ensuring that she easily transitioned into the role. The two began a relationship after the show's run ended.

On April 23, 2017, the two had their first child, a daughter named Lucille Ruby. On March 25, 2021, their son, Able Phineas, was born.

== Performances ==
=== Stage ===
Year	Title	Role	Notes
2012	Lempicka	Suzy Solidor	
2014–15	Invisible Thread	Eden	
2015	Brooklynite	Astrolass	
2018	Waitress	Jenna	Broadway

=== Television ===
Year	Title	Role	Notes
2006	Cold Case	Dawn Hill - 1994	Episode: "Detention"
2010–11	Perfect Couples	Isabella	Recurring role; 6 episodes
2012	Unforgettable	Mena Levy	Episode: "Brotherhood"
2013	Hart of Dixie	Tara	Recurring role, 4 episodes
2014–18	The Affair	Jane	Recurring role, 9 episodes
2020	Love in the Time of Corona	Sade	Main role, limited series
2021	Bob's Burgers	Destiny (voice)	Episode: “Vampire Disco Death Dance” (s11 ep22)
2022–25	Chicago Med	Tara Goodwin	Recurring role, 6 episodes

=== Film ===
Year	Title	Role	Notes
2020	One Night in Miami...	Barbara Cooke	
2023	Day of the Fight	Jessica	
2023	Woman of the Hour	Laura	
