= Allegra Huston =

American screenwriter (born 1964)

- Born: 26 August 1964 (age 62); London, England
- Occupations: Author; editor; writer
- Children: 1
- Parent(s): Enrica Soma (mother); John Huston (adoptive father); John Julius Cooper (biological father)
- Relatives: Anjelica Huston (half-sister); Tony Huston (half-brother); Danny Huston (half-brother); Artemis Cooper (half-sister); Jack Huston (nephew)
- Writing career
- Period: 2009–present
- Genre: Nonfiction
- Notable works: Love Child: A Memoir of Family Lost and Found
- Website: www.allegrahuston.com

Allegra Huston (born 26 August 1964) is a British-American author, editor, and writer based in Taos, New Mexico.

She is the author of Write What You Don't Know (with James Navé), the book of the Imaginative Storm creative writing method; Love Child: A Memoir of Family Lost and Found, and the novel A Stolen Summer (Say My Name in hardback); as well as How to Edit and Be Edited and How to Read for an Audience (with James Navé).

She is also the screenwriter and producer of the short film Good Luck, Mr. Gorski, and producer of the short film Why Am I?

== Early life and family ==
Allegra Huston was born to ballerina Enrica Soma Huston and John Julius Norwich, 2nd Viscount Norwich, a British historian and writer. After her mother’s death in a car accident when Huston was four years old, she was raised in Ireland and Los Angeles by film director John Huston, her mother’s estranged husband.

She is part of the extended Huston family of artists and writers: actor/director Anjelica Huston, writer Tony Huston, actor/director Danny Huston, and actor/writer/director Jack Huston. Her paternal siblings are writer Artemis Cooper, and architect and writer Jason Cooper.

== Career ==
=== Writing and publishing ===
She hold a First Class Degree in English Language and Literature from Hertford College, Oxford and spent 9 years in publishing in the UK, as Editor at Chatto & Windus and her last four years as Editorial Director at Weidenfeld & Nicolson. Books edited by Huston include Jane Goodall's Through a Window, Robert Conquest's biography of Stalin, and Juliet Barker's The Brontes.

She also worked for two years at Pathé in London as development and acquisition consultant (1994-97) As an editor she has worked with 3 Booker Prize winners and 2 Nobel Prize winners.

Her memoir, Love Child: A Memoir of Family Lost and Found (2009), explores her complex family history and upbringing and was critically well received. Her first novel, Say My Name, was published by HarperCollins.

In addition to books, Huston has written personal essays and commentary on relationships, family life, and emotional honesty. A widely read essay published in You Magazine (Daily Mail) in 2017 examined the emotional impact of separation, parenting, and the challenges of sustaining family life, drawing on her own experiences.

Huston is a long-time creative writing teacher and workshop leader. She has taught at institutions and literary programs including the OSLEP program at the University of Oklahoma, the National University of Ireland, Galway, and the Taos Writers Conference.

She also leads an annual memoir workshop in Nova Scotia.

Together with poet and educator James Navé, Huston co-founded the Imaginative Storm writing method and co-authored the book and online course Write What You Don’t Know. The approach emphasizes intuition, embodied writing, imagination, and emotional authenticity over prescriptive rules.

Huston and Navé regularly offer online workshops, in-person intensives, and multi-day writing retreats, focusing on voice, narrative momentum, character development, and creative confidence.

Film and other work

Huston wrote the award-winning short film Good Luck, Mr. Gorski. Her creative work spans memoir, fiction, film, and teaching.

== Personal life ==
Huston has lived for many years in Taos, New Mexico, where she raised her son Rafael. His father is Cisco Guevara, river rafter and professional storyteller.

She holds British and American citizenship and has written about the experience of navigating identity, family, and belonging across countries.

== Published works ==
- Love Child: A Memoir of Family Lost and Found, published in April 2009 by Simon & Schuster (US) and Bloomsbury (UK).
- Say My Name: A Novel (London: HQ, July 2017; New York: MIRA, January 2018), republished in paperback as A STOLEN SUMMER (2019)
- Write What You Don't Know: 10 Steps to Writing with Confidence, Energy, and Flow (with James Navé)
- Twice 5 Miles Guides: How to Edit and Be Edited and How to Read for an Audience (with James Navé)
