= Leonard Gardner =

American novelist

- Born: November 3, 1933 (age 93)
- Occupations: novelist, short story writer, and screenwriter
- Writing career
- Notable work: Fat City

Leonard Gardner (born November 3, 1933) is an American novelist, short story writer, and screenwriter. His writing has appeared in The Paris Review, Esquire, The Southwest Review, and other publications, and he was awarded a Guggenheim Fellowship.

Gardner was born in Stockton, California, and went to San Francisco State University. He currently lives in Larkspur, California.

Gardner's 1969 novel Fat City is regarded as an American classic by at least one writer, whose stature has increased over the years. His screen adaptation of Fat City was made into an acclaimed 1972 film of the same title, directed by John Huston. The book and movie are set in and around Stockton and concern the struggles of third-rate pro boxers who only dimly comprehend that none of them will ever make the big time. Devoid of the usual "sweet science" cliches, the book roils with dark pessimism as the characters eke out a gritty existence. It is considered by some an underappreciated classic of early 1970s cinema. In their memoirs, producer Ray Stark and director John Huston both cited it as among their finest achievements.

Gardner adapted his short story "Jesus Christ Has Returned to Earth and Appears Here Nightly" into the screenplay for the low-budget 1989 film Valentino Returns. He has a small part in the film, playing a character named Lyle.

Gardner has made a couple of other acting appearances, most notably in Francis Ford Coppola's 1988 film Tucker: The Man and His Dream. Gardner appears in a handful of scenes as a character known only as the Gas Station Owner.

He has written a number of screenplays for television, including several for NYPD Blue, for which he was a writer and producer for a few seasons.

== Publications ==
=== Novel ===
- Fat City (1969)

=== Short stories ===
- "Christ Has Returned to Earth and Preaches Here Nightly", Transfer (Fall 1962) and The Paris Review 35 (Fall 1965)
- "The Last Picking", Genesis West 1.3 (Spring 1963)
- "An Arkansas Traveler", Genesis West 3.1/2 (Winter 1965)
- "Flea Circus", Southwest Review 50.4 (Autumn 1965)

=== Essays ===
- "Stopover in Caracas", Esquire (October 1974)
- "Sweeter Than Sugar", Inside Sports (August 31, 1980)
- "The Contender", Brick 88 (Winter 2012)
