= Day of the Fight (2023 film) =

Film by Jack Huston

- Theatrical release poster
- Directed by: Jack Huston
- Written by: Jack Huston
- Produced by: Josh Porter; Jack Huston; Jai Stefan; Emma Tillinger Koskoff; Colleen Camp
- Starring: Michael Pitt; Nicolette Robinson; John Magaro; Steve Buscemi; Ron Perlman; Joe Pesci
- Cinematography: Peter Simonite
- Edited by: Joe Klotz
- Music by: Ben MacDiarmid
- Production companies: Cysa Films; Akrasia Films; Shrink Media; First Love Films
- Distributed by: Falling Forward Films
- Release dates: September 5, 2023 (Venice); November 15, 2024 (limited)
- Running time: 108 minutes
- Country: United States
- Language: English
- Box office: $78,360

Day of the Fight is a 2023 American drama film written and directed by Jack Huston in his directorial debut. It was inspired by and named after Day of the Fight, Stanley Kubrick's 1951 short-subject documentary. It stars Michael Pitt, Nicolette Robinson, John Magaro, Steve Buscemi, Ron Perlman, and Joe Pesci. It premiered at the 80th Venice International Film Festival on September 5, 2023.

== Plot ==
Follows a once-renowned boxer as he takes a redemptive journey through his past and present, on the day of his first fight since he left prison.

== Cast ==
- Michael Pitt as Mike Flannigan
- Ron Perlman as Stevie
- Nicolette Robinson as Jessica
- John Magaro as Patrick
- Joe Pesci as Tony, Mike's father
- Steve Buscemi as Colm, Mike's uncle
- Anatol Yusef as Saul

== Production ==
In December 2022, it was announced that production on the film had begun in New York and New Jersey. In June 2023, it was announced that principal photography had been completed.

The cast features several actors who starred in the HBO series Boardwalk Empire previously, including Pitt, Buscemi, and Yusef, as well as Huston himself who played disfigured World War I veteran Richard Harrow.

== Release ==
In 2024, Falling Forward Films had acquired the U.S. distribution rights, and set a limited release date for November 15, followed shortly by a nationwide expansion, with intent on qualifying for the upcoming awards season. The film premiered at the 80th Venice International Film Festival on September 5, 2023.

== Reception ==
On the review aggregator website Rotten Tomatoes, 85% of 48 critics' reviews are positive. The website's consensus reads: "An old-fashioned slugger story that leans heavily on its arresting visual style, Day of the Fight marks a bruising and vivid directorial debut for Jack Huston." Metacritic, which uses a weighted average, assigned the film a score of 64 out of 100, based on 11 critics, indicating "generally favorable" reviews.

Guy Lodge of Variety gave the film a positive review despite noting that "the cliché count edges into drinking-game territory". He praised the cinematography, writing, "The light and shade here is all in Peter Simonite's splendid, inky-shadowed monochrome lensing; Huston's visual sense outweighs his screenwriting."
