= Fat City (film) =

1972 film by John Huston

- Theatrical release poster
- Directed by: John Huston
- Screenplay by: Leonard Gardner
- Based on: Fat City (1969 novel) by Leonard Gardner
- Produced by: Ray Stark; John Huston
- Starring: Stacy Keach; Jeff Bridges; Susan Tyrrell; Candy Clark
- Cinematography: Conrad L. Hall
- Edited by: Walter A. Thompson
- Music by: Marvin Hamlisch
- Production company: Rastar
- Distributed by: Columbia Pictures
- Release date: July 26, 1972 (U.S.)
- Running time: 97 minutes
- Country: United States
- Language: English

Fat City is a 1972 American sports drama film directed and produced by John Huston, and adapted by Leonard Gardner from his 1969 novel. It stars Stacy Keach, Jeff Bridges, Susan Tyrrell, and Candy Clark in her film debut.

The plot follows former boxing contender Billy Tully, who crosses paths with younger fighter Ernie Munger. Tully convinces Munger to train with his former trainer, Ruben. The supporting cast features real-life boxers Art Aragon, Curtis Cokes, and Sixto Rodriguez Noriega, along with trainer Al Silvani.

The film's title refers to the city of Stockton, California, the main setting. According to Gardner, the title is meant to be ironic, "Fat City is a crazy goal no one is ever going to reach."

Released by Columbia Pictures on July 26, 1972, Fat City was a critical success. Susan Tyrell was nominated for an Academy Award for Best Supporting Actress for her performance.

== Plot ==
Billy Tully, a 29-year-old ex-boxer already past his prime, goes to a gym in Stockton, California, to get back into shape. There he meets and spars with Ernie Munger, an 18-year-old working a speed bag. Seeing potential in the youngster, Tully suggests that Munger look up his former manager and trainer Ruben Luna. Tully later tells combative barfly Oma Lee Greer and her easygoing boyfriend Earl how impressed he is with the kid. Newly inspired, Tully decides to get back into boxing himself.

Tully's life has been a mess since his wife left him. He drinks too much, cannot hold a job, and picks produce with migrant workers to make ends meet. He still blames Ruben for mishandling his last fight, a loss due to multiple cuts. Tully moves in with the alcoholic Oma after Earl is sent to jail, but their relationship is rocky. Munger is knocked out his first fight, suffering a broken nose, and KO'd again in his next. He gets pressured into marriage by his girlfriend after getting her pregnant, and turns to picking fruit to supplement his ring pay.

In order to create a suitable draw, Tully is matched against a tough but older Mexican boxer, Arcadio Lucero, for his first bout back. Lucero is passing blood before the fight, and in considerable pain throughout it. Discovering Lucero is weak in the middle, Tully works him heavily there. They knock each other down before Tully is declared the winner by TKO. His celebration is brief when Tully discovers that less training expenses, advances, and Ruben's cut as trainer, he will receive only $100 from a purse not even $275. Shocked, and feeling betrayed, he breaks with his friend. Returning to Oma's apartment, he finds Earl there, who assures him that the volatile Oma wants nothing more to do with him.

Heading home from a fight one night, Munger sees a wasted Tully in the street and tries to ignore him. Tully asks him to have a drink; he declines, but reluctantly agrees to coffee. As the pair sit in a diner, Tully looks around at the crowd of down-and-outers there, all of whom seem at an impassable distance. Munger says he needs to leave, but Tully asks him to stay and talk a while. Munger agrees, and the two drink their coffee together in silence.

== Cast ==
- Stacy Keach as Billy Tully
- Jeff Bridges as Ernie Munger
- Susan Tyrrell as Oma Lee Greer
- Candy Clark as Faye Murdock
- Nicholas Colasanto as Ruben Luna
- Art Aragon as Babe Azzolino
- Curtis Cokes as Earl
- Sixto Rodriguez Noriega as Arcadio Lucero
- Billy Walker as Wes Haynes
- Ruben Navarro as Fuentes
- Álvaro López as Manuel Rosales
- Al Silvani as Referee

== Production ==
John Huston was attracted to the project due to his own youthful experiences with boxing. He had attended Abraham Lincoln High School in Los Angeles because of its boxing program, and despite it being in a rougher part of the city. At the age of 15, he was a top-ranking amateur lightweight in California. He ended his brief professional career after suffering a broken nose.

=== Casting ===
Huston originally planned to cast 48 year-old Marlon Brando as Billy Tully and Beau Bridges as Ernie Munger. When Brando informed Huston repeatedly that he needed some more time to think about it, Huston finally came to the conclusion that the star wasn't really interested and looked for another actor until he finally cast the then relatively unknown 30 year-old Stacy Keach. Beau Bridges turned down the role, feeling he was too old to convincingly play an 18-year old, but recommended his younger brother, 23 year-old Jeff, for the part.

Huston's cast several real-life boxers, some of them his old acquaintances, in supporting roles. Art Aragon (Babe Azzolino) was a former top lightweight contender, and Curtis Cokes (Earl) was the simultaneous WBA, WBC and The Ring world welterweight champion, though ironically his character isn't a boxer. Sixto Rodriguez Noriega, who played Keach's final opponent as Arcadio Lucero, was a professional boxer. Top boxing trainer Al Silvani was the film's fight choreographer, and appears in the film as a referee. Fat City was also the film debut of Candy Clark.

=== Filming ===
Like the novel by Leonard Gardner, the film was set in Stockton, California, and shot mostly on location there. All of the original skid row depicted in the novel was demolished (as part of the West End Redevelopment) from 1964 to 1969. Most of the skid row scenes were filmed in the outer fringe of the original skid row, which was torn down a year after Fat City was filmed in order to make way for the construction of the Ort Lofthus Freeway.

=== Music ===
The melancholic "Help Me Make It Through the Night" is sung by its composer, Kris Kristofferson, at the beginning and end of the movie. Marvin Hamlisch was the musical supervisor.

== Release ==
The film premiered in the United States on July 26, 1972. It was screened at film festivals including the Cannes Film Festival and the Palm Springs International Film Festival.

== Reception ==
=== Critical response ===
Vincent Canby, film critic for The New York Times, liked the film and Huston's direction. He wrote, "This is grim material but Fat City is too full of life to be as truly dire as it sounds. Ernie and Tully, along with Oma (Susan Tyrrell), the sherry-drinking barfly Tully shacks up with for a while, the small-time fight managers, the other boxers and assorted countermen, upholsterers, and lettuce pickers whom the film encounters en route, are presented with such stunning and sometimes comic accuracy that Fat City transcends its own apparent gloom."

Roger Ebert made the case for it as one of Huston's best films. He also appreciated the performances. Ebert wrote, "[Huston] treats [the story] with a level, unsentimental honesty and makes it into one of his best films...[and] the movie's edges are filled with small, perfect character performances."

Dave Kehr of the Chicago Reader wrote in 2000, "John Huston's 1972 restatement of his theme of perpetual loss is intelligently understated."

Film critic Dennis Schwartz wrote in 2005, "The downbeat sports drama is a marvelous understated character study of the marginalized leading desperate lives, where they have left themselves no palpable way out. The stunning photography by Conrad Hall keeps things looking realistic."

J. Hoberman of The Village Voice wrote in 2009, "The movie is crafty work and very much a show. In one way or another, right down to the percussively abrupt open ending, it's all about being hammered."

It has a 100% fresh rating on Rotten Tomatoes, based on 25 reviews. The site's consensus reads: "Fat City is a bleak, mordant, slice of life boxing drama that doesn't pull its punches".

== Influence ==
The drama is featured in the documentary Visions of Light: The Art of Cinematography (1992) for Conrad L. Hall's use of lighting.

In 2009, Fat City enjoyed a week-long revival screening at New York City's Film Forum.

As of 2024, filmmaker Spike Lee reportedly added Fat City to his list of "essential films" for film students to watch at NYU.

Reportedly, after a showing of this movie, champion boxer Muhammad Ali apparently said to Huston: "Man that's for real, that's me talking up there."

=== Awards and nominations ===
Wins

- Kansas City Film Critics Circle: KCFCC Award Best Actor Stacy Keach, (tied with Marlon Brando for The Godfather); 1972.
- Belgian Film Critics Association: Grand Prix; 1974.

Nominations

- Academy Awards: Best Actress in a Supporting Role, Susan Tyrrell; 1973.

==== New York Film Critics Circle ====
Under the then-extant rules, Stacy Keach should have been awarded Best Actor from the New York Film Critics Circle for his portrayal of Tully because it required only a plurality of the vote at the 1972 New York Film Critics Circle Awards. Keach was the top vote-getter for Best Actor. At the time, the NYCC was second in prestige only to the Academy Awards and was a major influence on subsequent Oscar nominations. A vocal faction of the NYFCC, dismayed by the rather low percentage of votes that would have given Keach the award, successfully demanded a rule change so that the winner would have to obtain a majority. In subsequent balloting, Keach failed to win a majority of the vote, and he lost ground to the performance of Marlon Brando in The Godfather. However, Brando could not gain a majority either. As a compromise candidate, Laurence Olivier in Sleuth eventually was awarded Best Actor.

== See also ==
- List of American films of 1972
- List of boxing films
