= John Huston =

American-Irish filmmaker and actor (1906–1987)

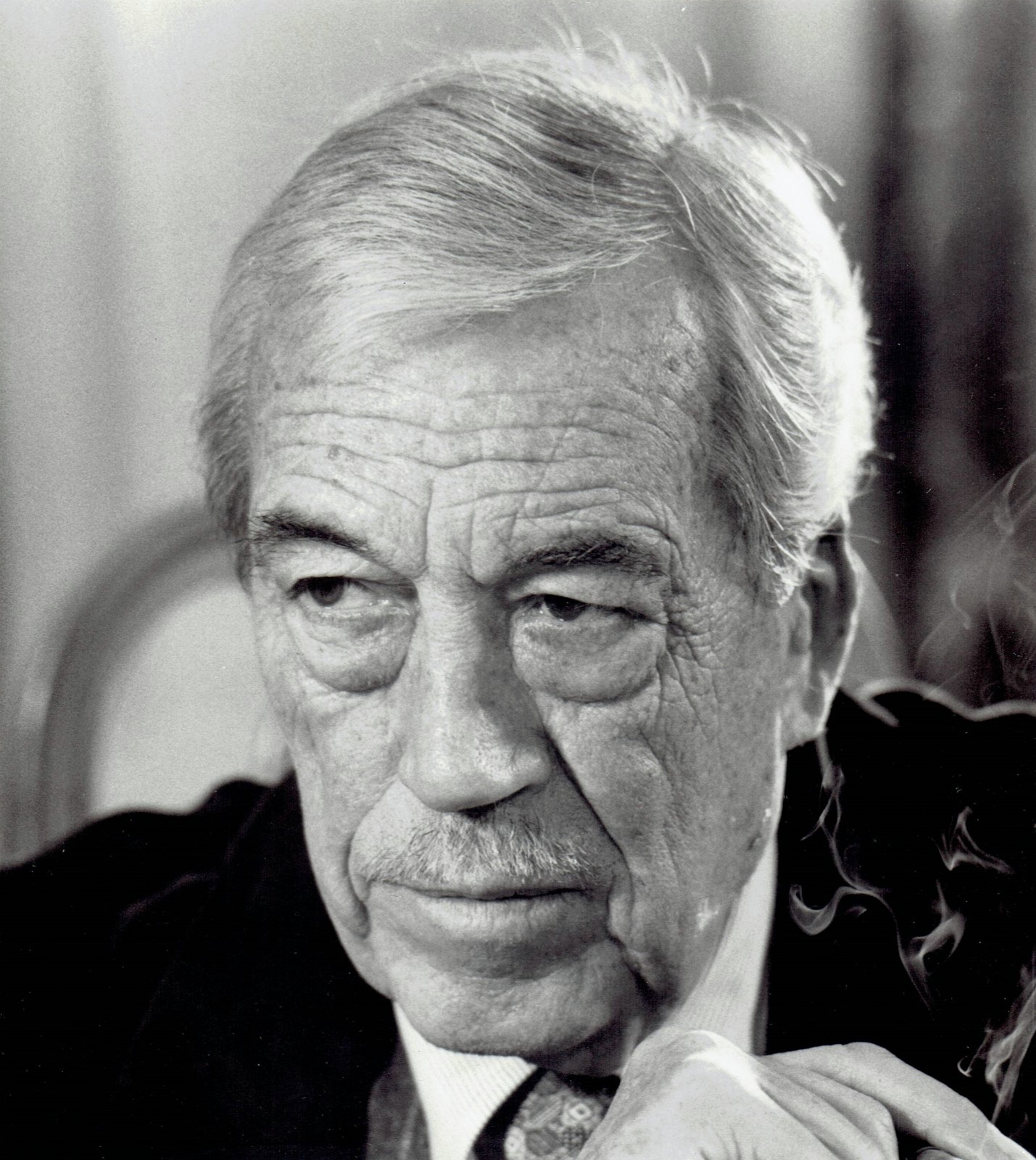
- Huston in 1979
- Born: August 5, 1906; Nevada, Missouri, U.S.
- Died: August 28, 1987 (aged 81); Middletown, Rhode Island, U.S.
- Resting place: Hollywood Forever Cemetery
- Citizenship: United States (until 1964); Ireland (after 1964)
- Occupations: Film director; screenwriter; actor; producer
- Years active: 1930–1987
- Works: Full list
- Spouses: Dorothy Harvey (m. 1925; div. 1933) Lesley Black (m. 1937; div. 1945) Evelyn Keyes (m. 1946; div. 1950) Enrica Soma (m. 1950; died 1969) Celeste Shane (m. 1972; div. 1977)
- Partner: Zoe Sallis
- Children: 5, including Anjelica, Tony, Danny, and Allegra
- Father: Walter Huston
- Awards: Full list
- Military career
- Allegiance: United States
- Branch: United States Army
- Service years: 1942–1946
- Rank: Major
- Unit: Army Signal Corps
- Conflicts: World War II; Pacific Theater
- Awards: Legion of Merit; American Campaign Medal; Asiatic–Pacific Campaign Medal; World War II Victory Medal

John Marcellus Huston (/ˈhjuːstən/ HEW-stən; August 5, 1906 – August 28, 1987) was an American and Irish filmmaker and actor. In a career spanning five decades, he wrote the screenplays for many of the 37 feature films he directed, many of which are today considered classics. He received numerous accolades including two Academy Awards and three Golden Globe Awards, as well as a nomination for a BAFTA Award. He also received the BAFTA Fellowship in 1980, a Special Lion for the Overall Work in 1985, and a Silver Lion in 1953.

The son and only child of actor Walter Huston, Huston studied and worked as a fine art painter in Paris. He then moved to Mexico and began writing, first plays and short stories, and later working in Los Angeles as a Hollywood screenwriter, and was nominated for several Academy Awards writing for films directed by William Dieterle and Howard Hawks, among others. His directorial debut came with The Maltese Falcon (1941), which despite its small budget became a commercial and critical hit; he continued to be a successful, if iconoclastic, Hollywood director for the next 45 years.

Huston directed acclaimed films such as The Treasure of the Sierra Madre (1948), Key Largo (1948), The Asphalt Jungle (1950), The African Queen (1951), Moulin Rouge (1952), Heaven Knows, Mr. Allison (1957), The Misfits (1961), The Night of the Iguana (1964), Fat City (1972), The Man Who Would Be King (1975), Annie (1982), Prizzi's Honor (1985) and The Dead (1987). During his 46-year career, Huston received 14 Academy Award nominations, winning twice. He is the only director in Academy history to have helmed both his father and child to Oscar acting wins.

He was also an actor, acting in numerous films and receiving nominations for an Academy Award and a Golden Globe Award for The Cardinal (1963) and Chinatown (1974) respectively. He also acted in Casino Royale (1967), Myra Breckinridge (1970) and Battle for the Planet of the Apes (1973). He voiced the wizard Gandalf in The Hobbit (1977) and The Return of the King (1980).

Huston has been referred to as "a titan", "a rebel", and a "renaissance man" in the Hollywood film industry. He traveled widely, settling at various times in France, Mexico, and Ireland. Huston was a citizen of the United States by birth but renounced this to become an Irish citizen and resident in 1964. He eventually returned to the United States, where he lived the rest of his life. He was the father of actress Anjelica Huston, whom he directed to an Oscar win in Prizzi's Honor.

== Early life ==
John Huston was born on August 5, 1906, in Nevada, Missouri. He was the only child of Rhea (née Gore) and Canadian-born Walter Huston. His father was an actor, initially in vaudeville, and later in films. His mother worked as a sports editor for various publications but stopped after John was born. Similarly, his father ended his stage acting career for steady employment as a civil engineer, although he returned to stage acting within a few years. He later became highly successful on both Broadway and then in motion pictures. He had Scottish, Scotch-Irish, English and Welsh ancestry.

Huston's parents divorced in 1913 when he was six years old. For much of his childhood, he lived and studied in boarding schools. During summer vacations, he traveled separately with each of his parents – with his father on vaudeville tours, and with his mother to horse races and other sports events. Young Huston benefited greatly from seeing his father act on stage, and he was later drawn to acting.

Some critics, such as Lawrence Grobel, surmise that his relationship with his mother may have contributed to his marrying five times, and seeming to have difficulty in maintaining relationships. Grobel wrote, "When I interviewed some of the women who had loved him, they inevitably referred to his mother as the key to unlocking Huston's psyche." According to actress Olivia de Havilland, "she [his mother] was the central character. I always felt that John was ridden by witches. He seemed pursued by something destructive. If it wasn't his mother, it was his idea of his mother."

As a child, Huston was often ill; he was treated for an enlarged heart and kidney ailments. He recovered after an extended bedridden stay in Arizona and moved with his mother to Los Angeles, where he attended Abraham Lincoln High School. He dropped out after two years to become a professional boxer. By age 15 he was a top-ranking amateur lightweight boxer in California. He ended his brief boxing career after suffering a broken nose.

He also engaged in many interests, including ballet, English and French literature, opera, horseback riding, and studying painting at the Art Students League of Los Angeles. Living in Los Angeles, Huston became infatuated with the new film industry and motion pictures, as a spectator only. To Huston, "Charlie Chaplin was a god."

Huston returned to New York City to live with his father, who was acting in off-Broadway productions, and had a few small roles. He later remembered that while watching his father rehearse, he became fascinated with the mechanics of acting:

What I learned there, during those weeks of rehearsal, would serve me for the rest of my life.

After a short period of acting on stage, and having undergone surgery, Huston travelled alone to Mexico. During two years there, among other adventures, he obtained a position as an honorary member of the Mexican cavalry. He returned to Los Angeles and married Dorothy Harvey, a girlfriend from high school. Their marriage lasted seven years (1926–1933).

== Career ==
=== 1930–1939: Early career and directorial debut ===
During his stay in Mexico, Huston wrote a play called Frankie and Johnny, based on the ballad of the same title. After selling it easily, he decided that writing would be a viable career, and he focused on it. His self-esteem was enhanced when H. L. Mencken, editor of the popular magazine American Mercury, bought two of his stories, "Fool" and "Figures of Fighting Men." During subsequent years, Huston's stories and feature articles were published in Esquire, Theatre Arts, and The New York Times. He also worked for a period on the New York Graphic. In 1931, when he was 25, he moved back to Los Angeles in hopes of writing for the blossoming film industry. The silent films had given way to "talkies", and writers were in demand. His father had earlier moved there and already gained success in a number of films.

Huston received a script editing contract with Samuel Goldwyn Productions but, after six months of receiving no assignments, quit to work for Universal Studios, where his father was a star. At Universal, he got a job in the script department, and began by writing dialogue for a number of films in 1932, including Murders in the Rue Morgue, A House Divided, and Law and Order. The last two also starred his father, Walter Huston. A House Divided was directed by William Wyler, who gave Huston his first real "inside view" of the filmmaking process during all stages of production. Wyler and Huston became close friends and collaborators on a number of leading films.

Huston gained a reputation as a "lusty, hard-drinking libertine" during his first years as a writer in Hollywood. Huston described those years as a "series of misadventures and disappointments". In 1933 he was in a romantic relationship with actress Zita Johann. While driving drunk, with Johann as passenger, he hit a parked car sending Johann through the glass windshield. She suffered head trauma and Huston was charged with driving while intoxicated. His brief career as a Hollywood writer ended suddenly when he struck and killed actress Tosca Roulien, wife of actor Raul Roulien, while driving. There is a rumor that actor Clark Gable was responsible for the accident, but that MGM general manager Eddie Mannix paid Huston to take the blame. A coroner's jury absolved Huston of blame, but the incident left him "traumatized". He moved to London and Paris, living as a "drifter."

By 1937, the 31-year-old Huston returned to Hollywood intent on being a "serious writer." He married again, to Lesley Black. His first job was as scriptwriter with Warner Brothers Studio, and he formed his personal longterm goal to direct his own scripts. For the next four years, he co-wrote scripts for major films such as Jezebel, The Amazing Dr. Clitterhouse, Juarez, Dr. Ehrlich's Magic Bullet, and Sergeant York (1941). He was nominated for Academy Awards for his screenplays for both Ehrlich and Sergeant York. Huston wrote that Sergeant York, which was directed by Howard Hawks, has "gone down as one of Howard's best pictures, and Gary Cooper had a triumph playing the young mountaineer."

Huston was recognized and respected as a screenwriter. He persuaded the Warners to give him a chance to direct, under the condition that his next script also became a hit.

Huston wrote:

They indulged me rather. They liked my work as a writer and they wanted to keep me on. If I wanted to direct, why, they'd give me a shot at it, and if it didn't come off all that well, they wouldn't be too disappointed as it was to be a very small picture.

His next script was High Sierra (1941), to be directed by Raoul Walsh. The film became the hit Huston wanted. It also made Humphrey Bogart a star with his first major role, as a gunman on the run. Warners kept their end of the bargain and gave Huston his choice of subject. For his first directing assignment, Huston chose Dashiell Hammett's detective thriller, The Maltese Falcon, a film which failed at the box office in two earlier versions by Warners. However, studio head Jack L. Warner approved of Huston's treatment of Hammett's 1930 novel, and he stood by his word to let Huston choose his first subject.

Huston kept the screenplay close to the novel, keeping much of Hammett's dialogue, and directing it in an uncluttered style, much like the book's narrative. He did unusual preparation for his first directing job by sketching out each shot beforehand, including camera positions, lighting, and compositional scale, for such elements as closeups.

He especially benefited by selecting a superior cast, giving Humphrey Bogart the lead role. Bogart was happy to take the role, as he liked working with Huston. The supporting cast included other noted actors: Mary Astor, Peter Lorre, Sydney Greenstreet (his first film role), and his own father, Walter Huston. The film was given only a small B-movie budget, and received minimal publicity by Warners, as they had low expectations. The entire film was made in eight weeks for only $300,000.

Warners was surprised by the immediate enthusiastic response by the public and critics, who hailed the film as a "classic", with many ranking it as the "best detective melodrama ever made." Herald Tribune critic Howard Barnes called it a "triumph." Huston received an Academy Award nomination for the screenplay. After this film, Huston directed all of his screenplays, except for one, Three Strangers (1946). In 1942, he directed two more hits, In This Our Life (1942), starring Bette Davis, and Across the Pacific, another thriller starring Humphrey Bogart.

=== 1942–1946: Army years during World War II ===
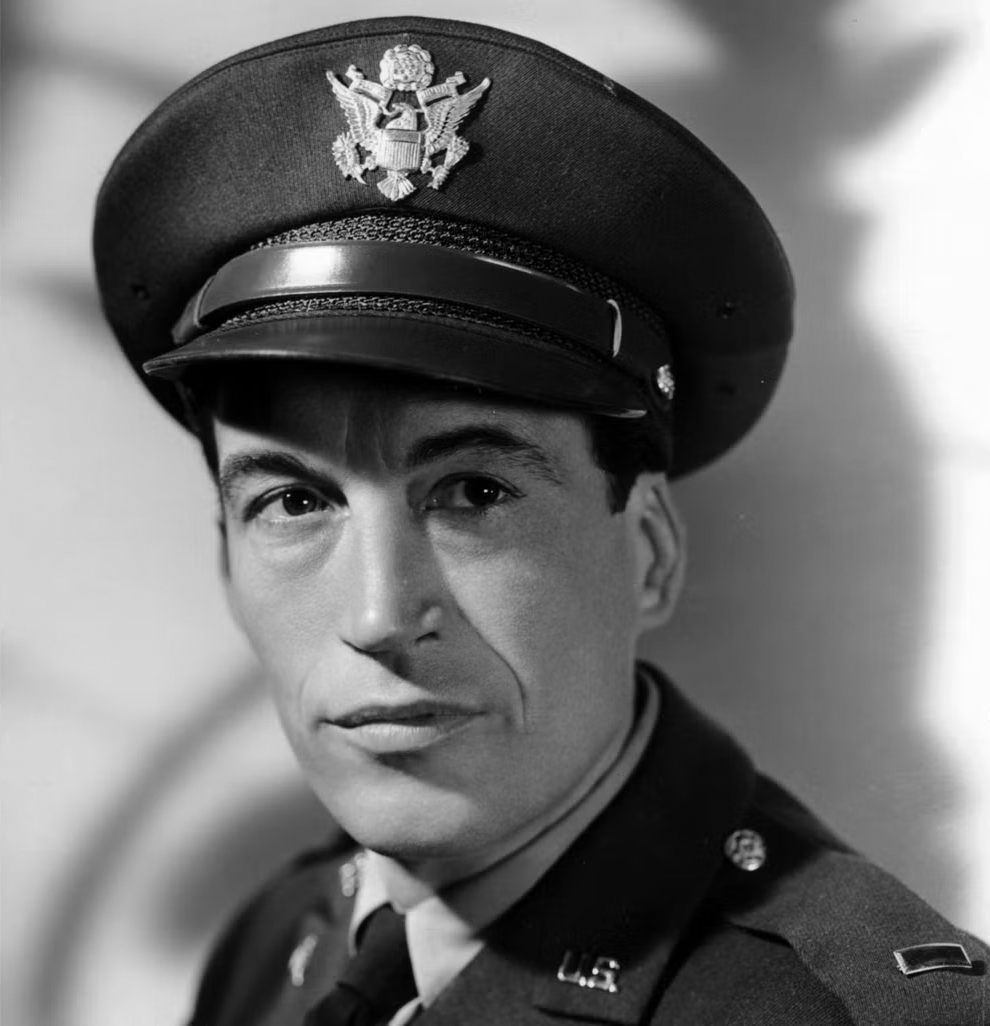
Huston in U.S. Army uniform

The Battle of San Pietro (1945)

In 1942 Huston served in the United States Army during World War II, making films for the Army Signal Corps. While in uniform with the rank of captain, he directed and produced three films that some critics rank as "among the finest made about World War II: Report from the Aleutians (1943), about soldiers preparing for combat; The Battle of San Pietro (1945), the story (censored by the Army) of a failure by America's intelligence agencies that resulted in many deaths, and Let There Be Light (1946), about psychologically damaged veterans. It was censored and suppressed for 35 years, until 1981.

Huston was promoted to the rank of major and received the Legion of Merit award for "courageous work under battle conditions." All of his films made for the Army were "controversial", and were either not released, were censored, or banned outright, as they were considered "demoralizing" to soldiers and the public. Let There Be Light was the most controversial as the Army banned the film from public viewing due to the ethics of filming the soldiers' recovery and the lack of written permission supplied by Huston. Years later, after Huston moved to Ireland, his daughter, actress Anjelica Huston, recalled that the "main movies we watched were the war documentaries." These war films thus had a major and lasting influence on John Huston and his work.

Huston performed an uncredited rewrite of Anthony Veiller's screenplay for The Stranger (1946), a film he was to have directed. When Huston became unavailable, the film's star, Orson Welles, directed instead; Welles had the lead role of a high-ranking Nazi fugitive who settles in New England under an assumed name.

=== 1947–1951: Breakthrough and acclaim ===
The Treasure of the Sierra Madre (1948)

Huston's next picture, which he wrote, directed, and briefly appeared in as an American asked to "help out a fellow American, down on his luck", was The Treasure of the Sierra Madre (1948). It would become one of the films that established his reputation as a leading filmmaker. The film, also starring Humphrey Bogart, was the story of three drifters who band together to prospect for gold. Huston gave a supporting role to his father, Walter Huston.

Warners studio was initially uncertain what to make of the film. They had allowed Huston to film on location in Mexico, which was a "radical move" for a studio at the time. They also knew that Huston was gaining a reputation as "one of the wild men of Hollywood." In any case, studio boss Jack L. Warner initially "detested it." But whatever doubts Warners had were soon removed, as the film achieved widespread public and critical acclaim. Hollywood writer James Agee called it "one of the most beautiful and visually alive movies I have ever seen." Time magazine described it as "one of the best things Hollywood has done since it learned to talk." Huston won Oscars for Best Director and Best Adapted Screenplay; his father won for Best Supporting Actor. The film also won other awards in the U.S. and overseas.

Decades later, Film Comment magazine devoted four pages to the film in its May–June 1980 edition, with author Richard T. Jameson offering his impressions:

This film has impressed itself on the heart and mind and soul of anyone who has seen it, to the extent that filmmakers of great originality and distinctiveness like Robert Altman and Sam Peckinpah can be said to have remade it again and again ... without compromising its uniqueness.

Key Largo (1948)

Also in 1948, Huston directed Key Largo, again starring Humphrey Bogart. It was the story about a disillusioned veteran who clashes with gangsters on a remote Florida key. It co-starred Lauren Bacall, Claire Trevor, Edward G. Robinson, and Lionel Barrymore. The film was an adaptation of the stage play by Maxwell Anderson. Some viewers complained that it was still overly stage-bound. But the "outstanding performances" by all the actors saved the film, and Claire Trevor won an Oscar for best supporting actress. Huston was annoyed that the studio cut several scenes from the final release without his agreement. That, along with some earlier disputes, angered Huston enough that he left the studio when his contract expired.

The Asphalt Jungle (1950)

In 1950, he wrote and directed The Asphalt Jungle, a film which broke new ground by depicting criminals as somewhat sympathetic characters, simply doing their professional work, "an occupation like any other". Huston described their work as "a left-handed form of human endeavor." Huston achieved that effect by giving "deep attention" to the plot, involving a large jewelry theft, by examining the minute, step-by-step details and difficulties each of the characters had of carrying it out. Some critics felt that, by this technique, Huston had achieved an almost "documentary" style.

His assistant director Albert Band explains further:

I'll never forget it. We got on that set and he composed a shot in which ten elements were working all at the same time. Took half a day to do it, but it was fantastic. He knew exactly how to shoot a picture. His shots were all painted on the spot ... He had a great eye and he never lost his sense of composition.

Film critic Andrew Sarris considered it to be "Huston's best film", and the film that made Marilyn Monroe a recognized actress. Sarris also notes the similar themes in many of Huston's films, as exemplified by this one: "His protagonists almost invariably fail at what they set out to do." This theme was also expressed in Treasure of the Sierra Madre, where the group foundered on their own greed.

It starred Sterling Hayden and Sam Jaffe, a personal friend of Huston. Marilyn Monroe had her first serious role in this film. Huston said, "it was, of course, where Marilyn Monroe got her start." Monroe said Huston was the first genius that she had ever met, and that he made her feel that she finally had a chance of becoming a professional actress:

Even though my part was a minor one, I felt as if I were the most important performer in the picture—when I was before the camera. This was because everything I did was important to the director.

The film succeeded at the box office, and Huston was again nominated for an Oscar for best screenplay and best director, along with winning the Screen Directors Guild Award. This became a model for many similar movies by other filmmakers.

The Red Badge of Courage (1951)

Huston's next film, The Red Badge of Courage (1951), was of a completely different subject: war and its effect on soldiers. While in the army during World War II, he became interested in Stephen Crane's classic American Civil War novel of the same title. For the starring role, Huston chose World War II hero Audie Murphy to play the young Union soldier who deserts his company out of fear, but later returns to fight alongside them. MGM was concerned that the movie seemed too antiwar for the postwar period. Without Huston's input, they cut down the running time of the film from eighty-eight minutes to sixty-nine, added narration, and deleted what Huston felt was a crucial scene. Much of the history of the production of the film is documented in Lillian Ross' critically acclaimed 1952 book Picture.

The film performed poorly at the box office. Huston suggests that it was possibly because it "brought war very close to home." Huston recalls that at the preview showing, before the film was halfway through, "damn near a third of the audience got up and walked out of the theater." Despite the "butchering" and weak public response, film historian Michael Barson describes the movie as "a minor masterpiece."

At the same time, the film was also the cause of a growing feud between MGM founder Louis B. Mayer and Producer Dore Schary to the point where Huston felt like stepping down to avoid growing the conflict. However, Mayer encouraged Huston to stay on, telling him to fight for the picture regardless of what he thought of it.

The African Queen (1951)

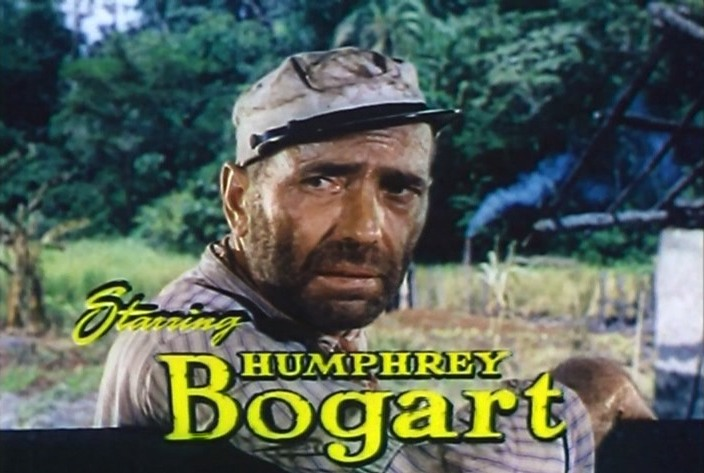
Humphrey Bogart in The African Queen (1951)

Before The Red Badge of Courage opened in theaters, Huston was already in Africa shooting The African Queen (1951), a story based on C. S. Forester's popular novel. It starred Humphrey Bogart and Katharine Hepburn in a combination of romance, comedy and adventure. Barson calls it "one of the most popular Hollywood movies of all time." The film's producer, Sam Spiegel, urged Huston to change the ending to allow the protagonists to survive, instead of dying. Huston agreed, and the ending was rewritten. It became Huston's most successful film financially, and "it remains one of his finest works." Huston was nominated for two Academy Awards—Best Director and Best Adapted Screenplay. Bogart, meanwhile, won his only Oscar for Best Actor for his role as Charlie Allnut.

Hepburn wrote about her experiences shooting the film in her memoir, The Making of the African Queen: Or How I went to Africa with Bogart, Bacall, and Huston and almost lost my mind. Clint Eastwood directed and starred in the film White Hunter, Black Heart, based on Peter Viertel's novel of the same name, which tells a fictional version of the making of the film.

=== 1952–1966: HUAC period ===
In 1952 Huston moved to Ireland as a result of his "disgust" at the "witch-hunt" and the "moral rot" he felt was created by investigation and hearings by the House Committee on Un-American Activities (HCUA), which had affected many of his friends in the movie industry. Huston had, with friends including director William Wyler and screenwriter Philip Dunne, established the "Committee for the First Amendment", as a response to the ongoing government investigations into communists within the film industry. The HCUA was calling numerous filmmakers, screenwriters, and actors to testify about any past affiliations.

He later described, in general, the types of people who were alleged communists:

The people who did get caught up in it were, for the most part, well-intentioned boobs from a poor background. A number of them had come from the Lower East Side of Manhattan, and out in Hollywood, they sort of felt guilty for living the good life. Their social conscience was more acute than the next fellow's.

Huston took producing, writing, and directing credits for his next two films: Moulin Rouge (1952); and Beat the Devil (1953); both of these were financed by the Woolf brothers for whom Huston had made African Queen. Moby Dick (1956), however, was written by Ray Bradbury, although Huston had his name added to the screenplay credit after the completion of the project. Although Huston had personally hired Bradbury to adapt Herman Melville's novel into a screenplay, Bradbury and Huston did not get along during pre-production. Bradbury later dramatized their relationship in the short story "Banshee". When this was adapted as an episode of The Ray Bradbury Theater, Peter O'Toole played the role based on John Huston. Bradbury wrote more poems, essays, and stories on his time in Ireland, but was reluctant to write a book because he did not want to gossip about Huston. It was not until after he read Katharine Hepburn's memoir, The Making of the African Queen, that he decided that he could write "a book which is fair, which presents the Huston that I loved along with the one that I began to fear on occasion." He published Green Shadows, White Whale, a novel about his time in Ireland with Huston, almost 40 years after he wrote the screenplay for Moby Dick.

Huston had been planning to film Herman Melville's Moby-Dick for the previous ten years, and originally thought the starring role of Captain Ahab would be an excellent part for his father, Walter Huston. After his father died in 1950, Huston chose Gregory Peck to play the role. The movie was filmed over a three-year period on location in Ireland, where Huston was living. The fishing village of New Bedford, Massachusetts, was recreated along the waterfront; the sailing ship in the film was fully constructed to be seaworthy; and three 100-foot whales were built out of steel, wood, and plastic. In the film, Huston's voice was dubbed for the voice of actor Joseph Tomelty and a Pequod lookout. But the film failed at the box office. Critics such as David Robinson suggested that the movie lacked the "mysticism of the book" and thereby "loses its significance."

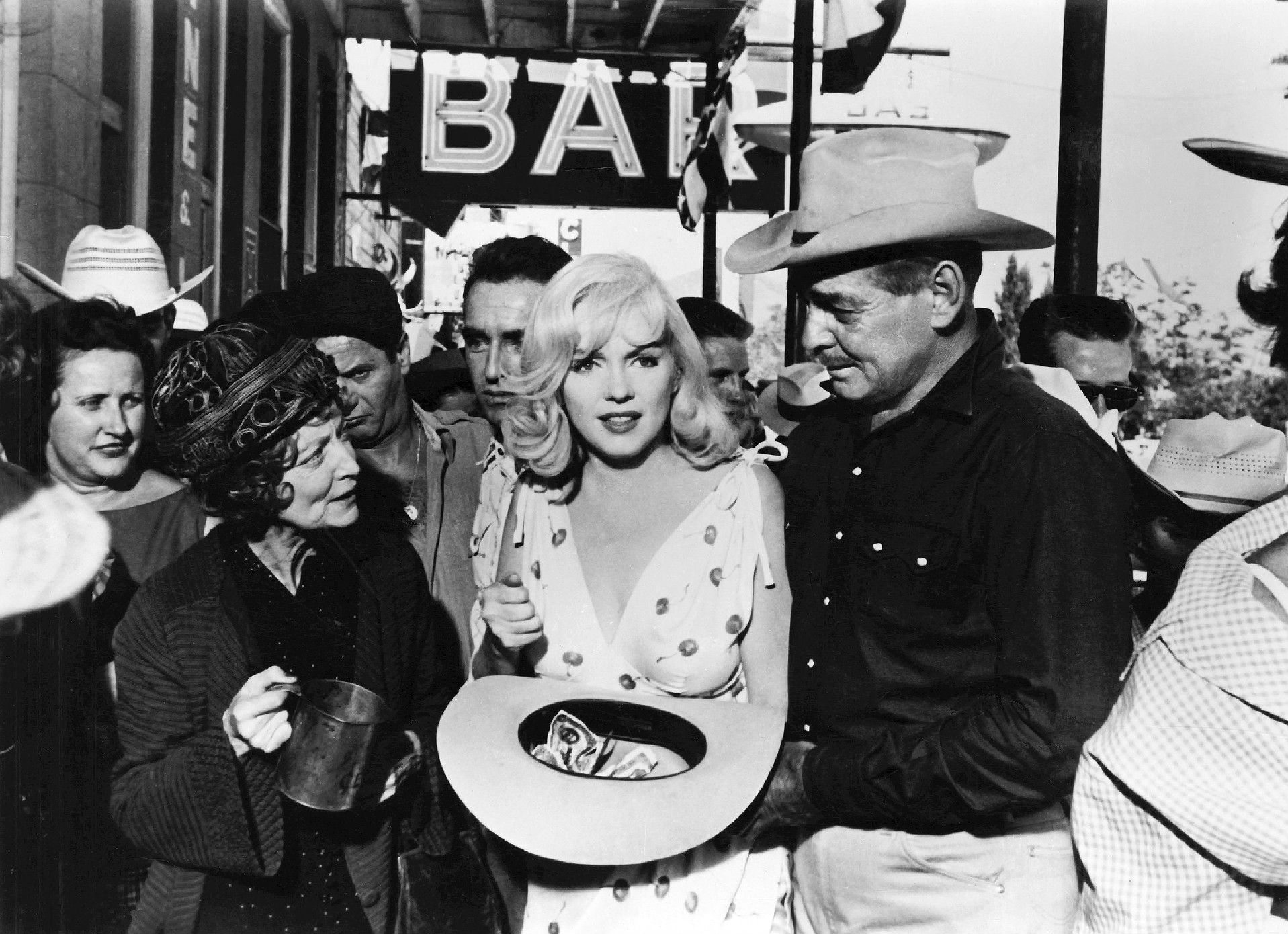
Marilyn Monroe (center), Clark Gable (right), filming in 1961 for The Misfits

Of Huston's next five films, only The Misfits (1961), gained critical approval. Critics have since noted the "retrospective atmosphere of doom" associated with the film. Clark Gable, the star, died of a heart attack a few weeks after the filming was completed; Marilyn Monroe never finished another film, and died a year later after being suspended during the filming of Something's Got to Give; and costars Montgomery Clift (1966) and Thelma Ritter (1969) also died over the next decade. But two of the Misfits stars, Eli Wallach and Kevin McCarthy, lived another 50 years. During the filming, Monroe was sometimes taking prescribed drugs, which led to her arriving late on the set. Monroe also sometimes forgot her lines. Monroe's personal problems eventually led to the breakup of her marriage to playwright Arthur Miller, the scriptwriter, "virtually on set." Miller dramatized the making of The Misfits in his final play, Finishing the Picture, where Huston is represented as the director. Huston later commented about this period in Monroe's career: "Marilyn was on her way out. Not only of the picture, but of life."

He followed The Misfits with Freud: The Secret Passion, a film quite different from most of his others. Besides directing, he also narrates portions of the story. Film historian Stuart M. Kaminsky notes that Huston presents Sigmund Freud, played by Montgomery Clift, "as a kind of savior and messiah", with an "almost Biblical detachment." As the film begins, Huston describes Freud as a "kind of hero or God on a quest for mankind":

This is the story of Freud's descent into a region as black as hell, man's unconscious, and how he let in the light.

Huston explains how he became interested in psychotherapy, the subject of the film:

I first got into that through an experience in a hospital during the war, where I made a documentary about patients suffering from battle neuroses. I was in the army and made the picture Let There Be Light. That experience started my interest in psychotherapy, and to this day Freud looms as the single huge figure in that field.

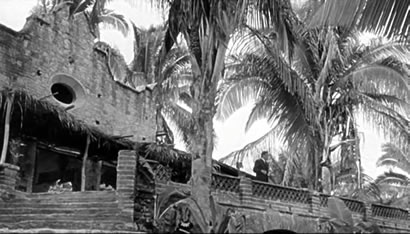
Huston's Night of the Iguana set on Mismaloya Beach in Puerto Vallarta, Mexico

For his next film, Huston again traveled to Puerto Vallarta, Mexico, after meeting an architect, Guillermo Wulff, who owned property and businesses in the town. The filming of The Night of the Iguana took place in a beach cove called Mismaloya, about thirty minutes south of town. Huston adapted the stage play by Tennessee Williams. The film stars Richard Burton and Ava Gardner, and was nominated for several Academy Awards. The production attracted intense worldwide media attention, due to Burton bringing his celebrity mistress, actress Elizabeth Taylor (who was still married to singer Eddie Fisher at the time) to Puerto Vallarta. Huston liked the town where filming took place so much that he bought a house near there, as did Burton and Taylor. Guillermo Wulff and Huston became friends and always spent time together while Huston was in town, more frequently at Wulff's El Dorado Restaurant on Los Muertos Beach.

Producer Dino De Laurentis traveled to Ireland to ask Huston to direct The Bible: In the Beginning. Although De Laurentis had ambitions for a broader story, he realized that the subject could not be adequately covered and limited the story to less than the first half of the Book of Genesis. Huston enjoyed directing the film, as it gave him a chance to indulge his love of animals. Besides directing he also played the role of Noah and the voice of God. The Bible earned rentals of $15 million in North America, making it the second highest-grossing film of 1966. However, because of its bloated budget of $18 million (which made it the most expensive movie of Huston's career), 20th Century Fox ended up losing $1.5 million.

Huston enjoyed describing details about the filming:

Every morning before beginning work, I visited the animals. One of the elephants, Candy, loved to be scratched on the belly behind her foreleg. I'd scratch her and she would lean farther and farther toward me until there was some danger of her toppling over on me. One time I started to walk away from her, and she reached out and took my wrist with her trunk and pulled me back to her side. It was a command: "Don't stop!" I used it in the picture. Noah scratches the elephant's belly and walks away, and the elephant pulls him back to her time after time.

=== 1967–1969: Involvement with the Irish film industry ===
I think the politicians who supported building the studio can take consolation in the fact that it's brought a lot of money to Ireland. We're spending more than a million dollars in Ireland and we wouldn't be here if it weren't for Ardmore.

— John Huston, in an interview on RTÉ

While working on Casino Royale (1967), Huston took interest in the Irish film industry, which had historically struggled to attain domestic or international success. There were rumours that he would buy Ireland's premiere film location, Ardmore Studios in Bray, County Wicklow. In 1967, Huston gave Taoiseach Jack Lynch a tour of Ardmore and asked to form a committee to help foster a productive Irish film industry. Huston served on the resulting committee with Irish filmmakers and journalists.

Lynch also ultimately agreed to offer tax breaks to foreign production companies if they shot on location in Ireland, and signed the Film Act of 1970.

Huston was interviewed in Irish journalist Peter Lennon's Rocky Road to Dublin (1967), where he argued that it was more important for Irish filmmakers to make films in Ireland than for foreign production companies to make international films.

In 1969, he shot Sinful Davey in Ireland using a mixed Irish and British cast.

=== 1972–1987: Later career and final films ===
After several films that were not well received, Huston returned to critical acclaim with Fat City. Based on Leonard Gardner's 1969 novel of the same name, it was about an aging, washed-up alcoholic boxer in Stockton, California, trying to get his name back on the map, while having a new relationship with a world-weary alcoholic. It also featured an amateur boxer trying to find success in boxing. The film was nominated for several awards. It starred Stacy Keach, a young Jeff Bridges, and Susan Tyrrell; she was nominated for an Academy Award for Best Supporting Actress. Roger Ebert stated Fat City was one of Huston's best films, giving it four out of four stars.

Perhaps Huston's most highly regarded film of the 1970s, The Man Who Would Be King was both a critical and commercial success. Huston had been planning to make this film since the '50s, originally with his friends Humphrey Bogart and Clark Gable. Eventually, the lead roles went to Sean Connery and Michael Caine. The movie was partly filmed on location in Morocco and the French Alps. The film was praised for its use of old-fashioned escapism and entertainment. Steven Spielberg has cited the film as one of the inspirations for his film Raiders of the Lost Ark.

After filming The Man Who Would Be King, Huston took his longest break between directing films. He returned with an offbeat and somewhat controversial film based on the novel Wise Blood. Here, Huston showed his skills as a storyteller, and boldness when it came to difficult subjects such as religion. Under the Volcano, Huston's last film set in Mexico, stars Albert Finney as an alcoholic ambassador during the beginnings of World War II. Adapted from the 1947 novel by Malcolm Lowry, the film was highly praised by critics, most notably for Finney's portrayal of a desperate and depressed alcoholic. The film was a success on the independent circuit.

John Huston's final film, 1987's The Dead, is an adaptation of the classic short story by James Joyce. This may have been one of Huston's most personal films, due to his citizenship in Ireland and his passion for classic literature. Huston directed most of the film from a wheelchair, as he needed an oxygen tank to breathe during the last few months of his life. The film was nominated for two Academy Awards and was praised by critics. Roger Ebert eventually placed it in his Great Movies list; a section of movies he claimed to be some of the best ever made. Huston died nearly four months before the film's release date. In the 1996 RTÉ documentary John Huston: An t-Éireannach, Anjelica Huston said that "it was very important for my father to make that film." She contends that Huston did not think that it was going to be his last film, but that it was his love letter to Ireland and the Irish.

== As an actor ==
Initially he had done some stage acting in his youth and had occasionally cast himself in bit parts in his own films, such as the unnamed rich American in The Treasure of the Sierra Madre. Towards the end of his career, Huston began to play more prominent roles in films by other directors. In 1963, director Otto Preminger asked if he would portray a Boston prelate in The Cardinal, and, writes author Philip Kemp, he "virtually stole the picture." He was nominated for an Academy Award for Best Supporting Actor for his role. He had a little participation (as did many others) in 1967's Casino Royale as actor and director. He acted in Roman Polanski's Chinatown (1974) as the film's master villain, Noah Cross. For his performance he earned a nomination for the Golden Globe Award for Best Supporting Actor – Motion Picture. He also acted as President Teddy Roosevelt's secretary of state John Hay in The Wind and the Lion. Huston enjoyed acting and denied that he took it all that seriously. "It's a cinch," he once said, "and they pay you damn near as much as you make directing."

He continued to take prominent supporting roles for the next two decades, including 1974's Chinatown (directed by Roman Polanski), and he lent his booming baritone voice as a voice actor and narrator to a number of prominent films. His last two films, 1985's Prizzi's Honor, and 1987's The Dead, filmed while he was in failing health at the end of his life, were both nominated for multiple Academy Awards. He died shortly after completing his last film. Huston said he did not regard himself very highly as an actor, saying he was proud only of his performance in Chinatown. But he had also greatly enjoyed acting in Winter Kills. He also played the Lawgiver in Battle for the Planet of the Apes.

Huston is famous to a generation of fans of J. R. R. Tolkien's Middle-earth stories as the voice of the wizard Gandalf in the Rankin/Bass animated adaptations of The Hobbit (1977) and The Return of the King (1980).

Huston played the lead in Orson Welles's last completed film, The Other Side of the Wind. In it he played an aging filmmaker named Jake Hannaford who was having great problems getting financing for his latest uncompleted film. Much of his portrayal was filmed in the spring of 1974 in Carefree, Arizona, at Southwestern Studio and a nearby mansion. But due to political and financial complications, The Other Side of the Wind was not released until the fall of 2018.

== Movie themes ==
I miss the order that old Hollywood had. It was much easier then to get a picture made than it is today. It's become a cliché that the studio people were picture makers then, but there is a large element of truth in it. They were people who wanted to make pictures, and they knew how to make them. They weren't accountants and bookkeepers, tax consultants and efficiency experts who don't know how to make pictures, or wheeler-dealers; that element just seems to have taken over today—promoters who just want to get a part of the action rather than people who want to make good movies.

— John Huston, Playboy interview, 1985

Author Ian Freer describes him as "cinema's Ernest Hemingway"—a filmmaker who was "never afraid to tackle tough issues head on." Huston's films were insightful about human nature and human predicaments. They also sometimes included scenes or brief dialogue passages that were remarkably prescient concerning environmental issues that came to public awareness in the future, in the period starting about 1970; examples include The Misfits and The Night of the Iguana (1964). Huston spent long evenings carousing in the Nevada casinos after filming, surrounded by reporters and beautiful women, gambling, drinking, and smoking cigars.

According to Kaminsky, Huston's stories were often about "failed quests" by a group of different people. The group would persist in the face of poor odds, doomed at the outset by the circumstances created by an impossible situation. However, some members of the doomed group usually survive, those who are "cool" and "intelligent", or someone who "will sacrifice everything for self-understanding and independence". Those types of characters are exemplified by Bogart in The Maltese Falcon, and Montgomery Clift in Freud.

Another type of quest often seen in Huston's films involves a pair of potential lovers trying to face a hostile world. Flint adds, however, that he "bucked Hollywood's penchant for happy endings", and many of his stories ended with "love unsatisfied".

Film historian James Goodwin adds that in virtually all of his films, there is some type of "heroic quest – even if it involves questionable motives or destructive alliances". In addition, the quest "is preferable to the spiritless, amoral routines of life". As a result, his best films, according to Flint, "have lean, fast-paced scripts and vibrant plots and characterizations, and many of them deal ironically with vanity, avarice and unfulfilled quests".

In the opinion of critics Tony Tracy and Roddy Flynn, "... what fundamentally fascinated Huston was not movies per se – that is, form – but the human condition ... and literature offered a road map for exploring that condition." In many of his films, therefore, he tried to express his interest by developing themes involving some of the "grand narratives" of the twentieth century, such as "faith, meaning, truth, freedom, psychology, colonialism, war and capitalism".

To Jameson, all of Huston's films are adaptations, and he believes that through his films there was a "cohesive world-view, not only thematically but also stylistically; there is the Huston look". The "Huston look" was also noted by screenwriter James Agee, who adds that this "look proceeds from Huston's sense of what is natural to the eye and his delicate, simple feeling for space relationships." In any case, notes Flint, Huston took "uncommon care to preserve the writer's styles and values ... and sought repeatedly to transpose the interior essence of literature to film with dramatic and visual tension", as he did in Red Badge of Courage, Moby Dick, and Under the Volcano.

Religion is also a theme that runs through many of Huston's films. In The Night of the Iguana, Kaminsky notes how Richard Burton, while preaching a sermon to his congregation, seems "lost, confused, his speech is gibberish", and leads his congregation to turn away from him. In other films, adds Kaminsky, religion is seen as "part of the fantasy world", that the actors must overcome to survive physically or emotionally. "These religious zealots counsel a move away from the pleasure of the world and human love, a world that Huston believes in," concludes Kaminsky. Such religious themes were also seen in The Bible, and Wise Blood, for example.

To Barson, however, Huston was among the "least consistent" filmmakers, although he concludes that he was one of the "most interesting directors of the past sixty years". Throughout his long career, many of his films did poorly and were criticized as a result. To a writer in 1972 he commented, "Criticism isn't a new experience for me. Pictures that are now thought of as, forgive the term, classics, weren't all that well thought of at the time they came out." After an interview a few years before he died, the reporter writes that "Huston said he missed the major studio era when people savored making movies, not just money."

According to Roger Ebert, in his review of Fat City, "His fascination with underdogs and losers. The characters in Huston movies hardly ever set out to achieve what they're aiming for. Sam Spade, in The Maltese Falcon, Huston's first film, ends up minus one partner and one woman he thought he could trust. Everyone is a loser in The Treasure of the Sierra Madre, and the gold blows back into the dust and is lost in it. Ahab, in Moby Dick. Marlon Brando's career Army officer in Reflections in a Golden Eye, even Bogart and Hepburn in The African Queen – they all fall short of their plans. The African Queen does have a happy ending, but it feels tacked-on and ridiculous, and the Queen destroys itself in destroying the German steamer. So this [Fat City] is a theme we find in Huston's work, but rarely does he fit it to characters and a time and place so well as in Fat City. Maybe that's because Huston knows the territory: he was a professional boxer himself for a while, and not a very good one."

== Directing techniques ==
John has meant a great deal in my life. Nobody would have heard of me if it hadn't been for him. Working with John ten years later is very good. He's a different kind of director than the people I've been working with. He's an artist with a camera—he sees it like a painter.

— Marilyn Monroe

He explored the visual aspects of his films throughout his career, sketching each scene on paper beforehand, then carefully framing his characters during the shooting. Some of Huston's films were adaptations of important novels, often depicting a "heroic quest", as in Moby Dick, or The Red Badge of Courage. In many films, different groups of people, while struggling toward a common goal, would become doomed, forming "destructive alliances", giving the films a dramatic and visual tension. Many of his films involved themes such as religion, meaning, truth, freedom, psychology, colonialism, and war.

George Stevens, Jr. notes that while many directors rely on post-production editing to shape their final work, Huston instead created his films while they were being shot: "I don't even know the editor of my films most of the time," Huston said. Actor Michael Caine also observed the same technique: "Most directors don't know what they want so they shoot everything they can think of — they use the camera like a machine gun. John uses it like a sniper." Danny Huston confirmed as much when he recalled what Huston said to him as the then-youngster was fooling around with a Kodak Super 8: "and I was shooting all these various things. He said, 'Stop it, stop doing that.' I said, 'What?' He said, 'When you go from left to right and right to left, what do you do?' So I looked from left to right and right to left. I said, 'I give up. What do I do?' He said, 'You blink. That's a cut.'"

Film writer Peter Flint pointed out other benefits to Huston's style: "He shot economically, eschewing the many protective shots favored by timid directors, and edited cerebrally so that financial backers would have trouble trying to cut scenes." Huston shot most of his films on location, working "intensely" six days a week, and "on Sundays, played equally intense poker with the cast and crew."

When asked how he envisions his films while directing and what his goals are, Huston replied:

To me the ideal film — which I've never succeeded in making — would be as though the reel were behind one's eyes and you were projecting it yourself, seeing what you wish to see. This has a great deal in common with thought processes ... That's why I think the camera is an eye as well as a mind. Everything we do with the camera has physiological and mental significance.

According to Kaminsky, much of Huston's vision probably came from his early experience as a painter on the streets of Paris. While there, he studied art and worked at it for a year and a half. Huston continued painting as a hobby for most of his life. Kaminsky also notes that most of Huston's films "reflected this prime interest in the image, the moving portrait and the use of color." Huston explored the use of "stylistic framing", especially well-planned close-ups, in much of his directing. In his first film, The Maltese Falcon, for instance, Huston sketched out all of his scenes beforehand, "like canvases of paintings". Anjelica Huston recalled that even for his subsequent films, he sketched storyboards "constantly... it was a form of study, and my father was a painter, a very good one... there was an extremely developed sensory quality about my father, he didn't miss a trick."

== Personal life ==
To producer George Stevens Jr., Huston symbolized "intellect, charm and physical grace" within the film industry. He adds, "He was the most charismatic of the directors I knew, speaking with a soothing, melodic voice that was often mimicked, but was unique to him." Actor Richard Burton, whom Huston directed in The Night of the Iguana, opined in his diaries that "Huston is a simpleton. But believes himself to be a genius. And a self aggrandizing liar." Huston loved the outdoors, especially hunting while living in Ireland. Among his life's adventures before becoming a Hollywood filmmaker, he had been an amateur boxer, reporter, short-story writer, portrait artist in Paris, a cavalry rider in Mexico, and a documentary filmmaker during World War II. Besides sports and adventure, he enjoyed hard liquor and relationships with women. Stevens describes him as someone who "lived life to its fullest". Barson even suggests that Huston's "flamboyant life" as a rebel would possibly make for "an even more engaging tale than most of his movies".

=== 1933 car accident ===
While driving on Sunset Boulevard on September 25, 1933, Huston struck and killed a pedestrian, a Brazilian dancer named Tosca Roulien, wife of Brazilian actor and film director Raul Roulien. The resulting media frenzy forced Huston to retreat temporarily from public performance and instead work as a screenwriter. A subsequent inquest absolved Huston of any blame for the accident.

About six months prior to this accident, while driving drunk, Huston crashed into a parked car injuring his passenger and his partner at the time, actress Zita Johann. Johann suffered head trauma as she was thrown through the windshield. Huston was charged with driving while intoxicated.

=== Beliefs ===
It has been suggested that John Huston was an atheist, but his religious beliefs are hard to determine. He claimed that he had no orthodox religion. His daughter, Anjelica, was raised Roman Catholic, and said that he did not like Hollywood, and "especially despised Beverly Hills ... he thought it was just fake from the ground up. He didn't like any of that; he was not intrigued or attracted by it." She said that, in contrast, "he liked to be in the wild places; he liked animals as much as he liked people."

=== Marriages ===
Huston married five times. His wives were:

1. Dorothy Harvey (1906–1982) — This youthful marriage ended after six years (October 17, 1926 – January 10, 1933).
2. Lesley Black (1910–2003) — During his marriage to Black he embarked on an affair with a married New York socialite, Marietta FitzGerald. While her lawyer husband was contributing to the war effort, the pair were once rumoured to have had sex so vigorously they broke a friend's bed. (m. 1937; div. 1945)
3. Evelyn Keyes (1916–2008) — They adopted a son, Pablo, whom John discovered orphaned in Mexico. (m. 1946; div. 1950)
4. Enrica Soma (1929–1969) — Huston and Soma were married until she died at age 39 in a car accident. They had two children: Walter Anthony "Tony" Huston (b. 1950), screenwriter and attorney, father of actor Jack Huston, and actress Anjelica Huston (b. 1951). During the marriage, Huston fathered a son, Danny Huston (b. 1962), with author Zoe Sallis. Danny became an actor. Soma also had a child from an extramarital affair during their marriage. Her daughter, Allegra Huston (b. 1964), is the child of John Julius Norwich. After Soma died, Huston treated Allegra as one of his own children. (m. 1950; died 1969)
5. Celeste Shane — In his autobiography, An Open Book, Huston refers to her as a "crocodile", and says that if he had his life to do over, he would not have married a fifth time. (m. 1972; div. 1977)

Grave of John Huston and his mother, Rhea, at Hollywood Forever

Huston visited Ireland in 1951 and stayed at Luggala, County Wicklow, the home of Garech Browne, a member of the Guinness family. He visited Ireland several times afterwards, and on one of these visits he bought and restored a Georgian home, St Clerans, in Craughwell, County Galway. Between 1960 and 1971 he served as Master of Fox Hounds (MFH) of the County Galway Hunt, whose kennels are at Craughwell. He renounced his U.S. citizenship and became an Irish citizen in 1964. His daughter Anjelica attended school in Ireland at Kylemore Abbey for a number of years. A film school is now dedicated to him on the NUI Galway campus.

=== Painting ===
Huston was an accomplished painter who wrote in his autobiography that "nothing has played a more important role in my life." As a young man, he studied at the Smith School of Art in Los Angeles but dropped out within a few months. He later studied at the Art Students League of New York. He painted throughout his life and had studios in each of his homes. One of the last pictures that Huston painted, a colorful watercolor including a ram and a bunch of grapes, along with his handwritten inscription, "In celebration of my beloved friend Baron Philippe's 60th harvest at Mouton -- John Huston," illustrated the label of the 1982 vintage of Château Mouton Rothschild, in one of the greatest years of one of the world's greatest wines, putting him in the company of the renowned artists who illustrated that wine's label in other years. He had owned a wide collection of art, including a notable collection of Pre-Columbian art.

=== Illness and death ===
A heavy smoker, Huston was diagnosed with emphysema in 1978. By the last year of his life he could not breathe for more than twenty minutes without needing oxygen. He died on August 28, 1987, in his rented home in Middletown, Rhode Island, from pneumonia as a complication of lung disease, aged 81. Huston is interred in the Hollywood Forever Cemetery in Hollywood with his mother.

== Archives ==
The moving image collection of John Huston is held at the Academy Film Archive. The film material at the Academy Film Archive is complemented by production files, photographs, and personal correspondence found in the John Huston papers, 1932–1981, at the academy's Margaret Herrick Library. The film archive preserved several of John Huston's home movies in 2001.

== Awards and honors ==
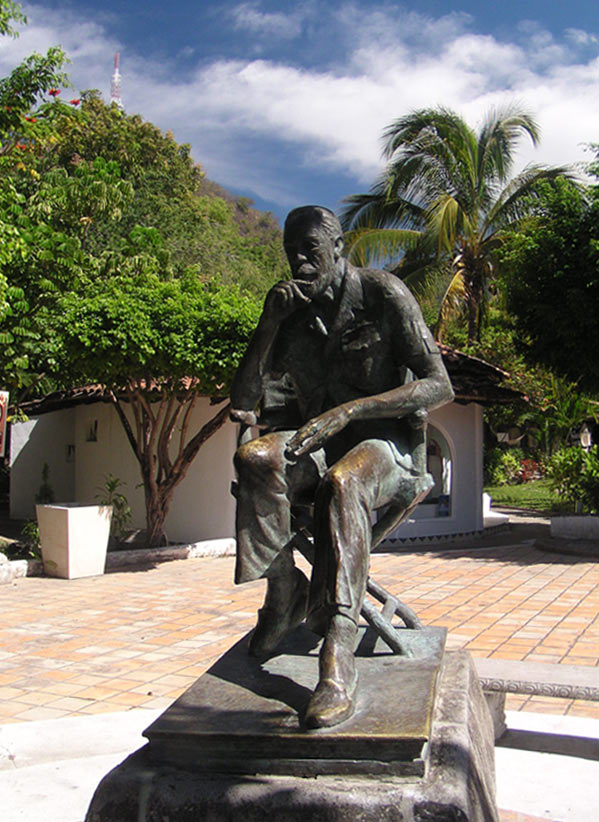
Statue of Huston, Puerto Vallarta, Mexico

Huston received 15 Oscar nominations in the course of his career and became the oldest person ever to be nominated for the Best Director Oscar when, at 79 years old, he was nominated for Prizzi's Honor (1985), a record he would hold until 2023, when Martin Scorsese attained a nomination at the age of 81 for directing Killers of the Flower Moon. Huston won two Oscars, for directing and writing the screenplay for The Treasure of the Sierra Madre. Huston also won a Golden Globe for that film. He received the Life Achievement Award from the American Film Institute in 1983, and the Career Achievement Award from the U.S. National Board of Review of Motion Pictures in 1984.

He directed both his father Walter and his daughter Anjelica in Oscar-winning performances (in The Treasure of the Sierra Madre and Prizzi's Honor, respectively), making the Hustons the first family to have three generations of Academy Award winners. He also directed her in Sinful Davey in 1969.

In addition, he also directed 13 other actors in Oscar-nominated performances: Sydney Greenstreet, Claire Trevor, Sam Jaffe, Humphrey Bogart, Katharine Hepburn, José Ferrer, Colette Marchand, Deborah Kerr, Grayson Hall, Susan Tyrrell, Albert Finney, Jack Nicholson and William Hickey.

In 1960, Huston was honored with a star on the Hollywood Walk of Fame for his contribution to motion pictures. In 1965, Huston received the Laurel Award for Screenwriting Achievement from the Writers Guild of America. In 1981, his film Escape to Victory was nominated for the Golden Prize at the 12th Moscow International Film Festival. A statue of Huston, sitting in his director's chair, stands in Plaza John Huston in Puerto Vallarta, Mexico.

Awards and nominations received by Huston's films
Year	Title	Academy Awards		BAFTA Awards		Golden Globe Awards	
Year	Title	Nominations	Wins	Nominations	Wins	Nominations	Wins
1941	The Maltese Falcon	3					
1948	The Treasure of the Sierra Madre	4	3	1		3	3
1948	Key Largo	1	1				
1950	The Asphalt Jungle	4		1		3	
1951	The Red Badge of Courage			1			
1951	The African Queen	4	1	2			
1952	Moulin Rouge	7	2	3		1	1
1957	Heaven Knows, Mr. Allison	2					
1962	Freud: The Secret Passion	2				4	
1964	The Night of the Iguana	4	1	1		5	
1966	The Bible: In the Beginning...	1				1	
1967	Casino Royale	1		1			
1972	Fat City	1					
1972	The Life and Times of Judge Roy Bean	1				2	
1975	The Man Who Would Be King	4		2		1	
1982	Annie	2		1		3	
1984	Under the Volcano	2				2	
1985	Prizzi's Honor	8	1	2	1	6	4
1987	The Dead	2					
Total		53	9	15	1	31	8

Directed Academy Award performances

Under Huston's direction, these actors have received Academy Award wins and nominations for their performances in their respective roles.

Year	Performer	Feature	Result
Academy Award for Best Actor
1952	Humphrey Bogart	The African Queen	Won
1953	José Ferrer	Moulin Rouge	Nominated
1985	Albert Finney	Under the Volcano	Nominated
1986	Jack Nicholson	Prizzi's Honor	Nominated
Academy Award for Best Actress
1952	Katharine Hepburn	The African Queen	Nominated
1958	Deborah Kerr	Heaven Knows, Mr. Allison	Nominated
Academy Award for Best Supporting Actor
1942	Sydney Greenstreet	The Maltese Falcon	Nominated
1949	Walter Huston	The Treasure of the Sierra Madre	Won
1951	Sam Jaffe	The Asphalt Jungle	Nominated
1986	William Hickey	Prizzi's Honor	Nominated
Academy Award for Best Supporting Actress
1949	Claire Trevor	Key Largo	Won
1953	Colette Marchand	Moulin Rouge	Nominated
1965	Grayson Hall	The Night of the Iguana	Nominated
1973	Susan Tyrell	Fat City	Nominated
1986	Anjelica Huston	Prizzi's Honor	Won

== See also ==
- John Huston filmography
- List of atheists in film, radio, television and theater
- Angela Allen (script supervisor)
