= Enrica Soma =

American model and dancer

- Born: Enrica Georgia Soma; May 9, 1929; New York City, U.S.
- Died: January 29, 1969 (aged 39); Dijon, France
- Occupations: Model; dancer
- Spouse: John Huston (m. 1950)
- Children: Anjelica Huston; Tony Huston; Allegra Huston

Enrica Georgia Soma (May 9, 1929 – January 29, 1969) was an American socialite, model, and prima ballerina. She was also the wife of director John Huston and mother of their three children.

== Life and career ==
Soma was born in Manhattan, New York, the daughter of immigrant parents from the small town of Ispra in northern Italy. Her father Antonio Angelo "Tony" Soma was an entrepreneur; her mother Angelica (née Fantoni, 1891–1933), an aspiring singer and actress. Enrica was known by her nickname "Ricki". Her father ran the famed Tony's Wife restaurant in Manhattan, a popular celebrity dining spot for figures such as Dorothy Parker. Tony Soma became a prominent Manhattan night-life figure, known as "Broadway Tony" and "Yoga Tony"; he would greet guests entering the restaurant by standing on his head and singing. After her mother died at the age of 42 from pneumonia, her father married again, to socialite Dorothy Flora Fraser (1910–1996). Ricki had a brother, Philip Soma, and half-siblings from her father's remarriage: Linda, Fraser, and Tony Jr.

Soma was pushed into the entertainment industry by her father, using the connections he had gained through his restaurant. She studied ballet with George Balanchine and joined the New York City Ballet, rising to a principal dancer. As a model, she appeared on the June 9, 1947, cover of Life Magazine at the age of 18. She worked often with Philippe Halsman.

In 1949, she participated in a later famous Life magazine photo layout, in which she posed with other up-and-coming actresses, Marilyn Monroe, Lois Maxwell, Cathy Downs, Suzanne Dalbert, Laurette Luez and Jane Nigh. She was offered a film contract by David O. Selznick, but turned down becoming an actress once she met Huston.

The director John Huston saw Soma's photo and began pursuing her, although he was married to actress Evelyn Keyes at the time. He and Soma married in 1950; she was 20 and pregnant with their first child, Walter Antony (Tony) Huston (b. 1950). Huston was 44. Tony became an Oscar-nominated screenwriter and attorney. Their second child is Anjelica Huston (b. 1951), who has won awards as an actress and director. The marriage was troubled due to the couple's age differences, as well as Huston's often being absent from home to make movies.

Both of them had affairs and children born outside their marriage. Huston had an affair with actress Zoe Sallis, who gave birth to his son, Danny Huston (b. 1962). Around this time, Soma had an affair with John Julius Norwich, and gave birth to their daughter Allegra Huston (b. 1964).

== Death ==
Soma died on January 29, 1969, in a car accident in Dijon, France. She was 39 years old.
