= Lochaber Narrow Gauge Railway =

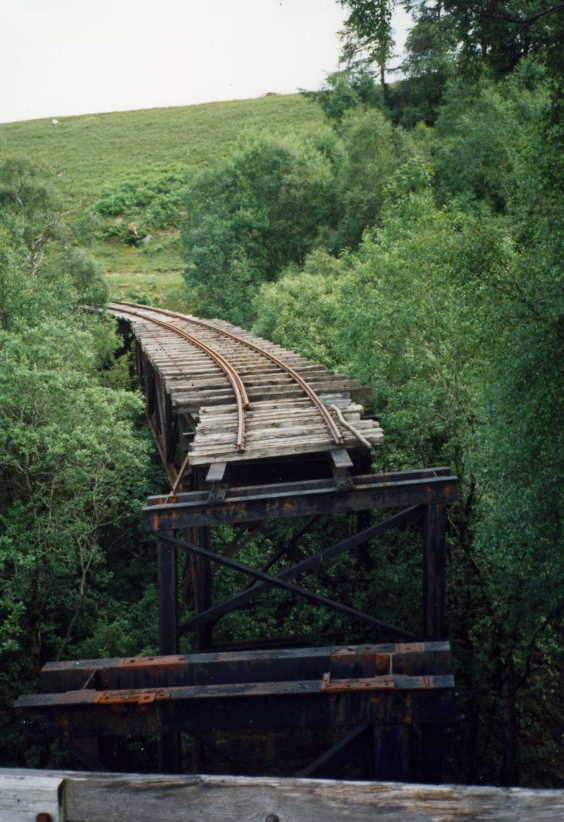
- Bridge number 15 on the closed Upper Works Railway, photographed in 1995

Overview
- Locale: Scotland; 56.822°N 4.721°W; Headquarters: Fort William

History
- Opened: 1925
- Closed: 1977

Technical
- Line length: 25 mi (40 km)
- Track gauge: 3 ft (914 mm)

The Lochaber Narrow Gauge Railway was a 3 ft (914 mm) narrow-gauge industrial railway. It was a relatively long line, built for the construction and subsequent maintenance of a 15-mile-long (24-kilometre) tunnel from Loch Treig to a factory near Fort William in Scotland. The tunnel was excavated to carry water for the Lochaber hydroelectric scheme in connection with aluminium production by British Aluminium. The railway came to be known colloquially as the 'Old Puggy Line'.

== Background ==
Aluminium is found in a clay-like mineral called bauxite, whose properties were first understood in 1821. This can be refined to produce alumina by the Bayer process, which is then reduced to the metal aluminium by the Hall–Héroult process. This requires large amounts of electricity to perform the electrolysis, and the first factory in the United Kingdom where this was carried out was opened at Foyers, on the shores of Loch Ness, in 1896. It was owned by the British Aluminium Company, and as world demand for the metal rose rapidly, a second factory was opened at Kinlochleven in 1908, using water power provided by the Blackwater Reservoir. With demand continuing to rise, plans were drawn up in 1918 to extend the Kinlochleven plant, but these met with strong opposition. In particular, Kinlochleven did not have sufficient spare space to build housing for the number of workers needed by the enlarged factory, and the private bill lodged with Parliament to promote the scheme was withdrawn.

A revised scheme was proposed in 1921, still using water from Loch Treig, but instead of routing it to Kinlochleven, it would be carried through a 15-mile (24 km) tunnel to a works built on the eastern edge of Fort William. Streams flowing over the route of the tunnel would be diverted into the tunnel at eleven points along its length. British Aluminium's third factory, the Lochaber Works at Fort William, was authorised by the Lochaber Water Power Act of 1921. The project was to be completed in three stages. Stage 1 included the tunnel from Loch Treig, the works and power house at Fort William, and a pier in Loch Linnhe, to enable materials to be delivered. Stage 2 included building dams at Loch Trieg and Loch Laggan, with the lochs linked by a 3.5-mile (5.6 km) tunnel. Stage 3 allowed the headwaters of the River Spey and the River Mashie to be diverted into Loch Laggan.

The first stage of the project took five years to build, starting in the mid-1920s, and cost £3 million. Messrs Meik and Halcrow were the consulting engineers, with Balfour Beatty acting as main contractors. The Lochaber Reduction Works, subsequently known as the Fort William factory, were built by Colin Macandrew. Turbines and generators for the power station were supplied by English Electric and Boving. In order to power the drills, pumps, tunnel lighting and other machinery used in the construction, a temporary power station was built at Monessie Gorge, near Roy Bridge. A 1,400-foot (430 m) unlined tunnel was constructed, which fed water into a 475-foot (145 m) pipeline, providing 100 feet (30 m) of head to the three three-phase generators. Each was rated at 1,500 kW, and around 25 miles (40 km) of overhead 11,000 Volt transmission lines distributed the power around the construction site, to be transformed down to 440 Volts where the power was needed. Some 1.5 miles (2.4 km) of narrow gauge railway were constructed to link the Monessie work sites together. It crossed the River Spean by a pontoon bridge, consisting of 12 pontoons moored in the river. The railway was probably of 2 ft (610 mm) gauge rather than the 3 ft (914 mm) gauge used for the later railway. Materials were delivered by stopping a train on the West Highland Railway main line after passenger services had ended for the day, and transferring them to the adjacent narrow gauge line, which was worked by a small steam locomotive. The tracks were probably removed once the power station had been built.

== Construction ==
A temporary jetty was constructed at the mouth of the River Lochy, where it met Loch Linnhe, to enable materials to be delivered by boat, while a more permanent concrete pier was being constructed. Work on the pier began in 1924, and was finished by the end of 1926. It was about 0.5 miles (0.8 km) long, and a 3 ft (914 mm) gauge railway linked it to the site of the aluminium factory, known as 'base camp' in the early stages of the project. Meik and Halcrow had specified that a railway would be required to link all of the working sites along the 17-mile (27 km) construction site, and the contract included a bonus payable if the railway and the temporary power station were completed in the first nine months. Good progress was made, and Balfour Beatty received the bonus. The railway linked the base camp to three intermediate shafts, seven adits and the valve shafts close to Loch Treig. Including the tunnel portal near to the factory, this provided 23 faces from which tunnelling was carried out. The railway enabled men and materials to be moved to the work sites, as there was no road access. The railway from the factory eastwards to Loch Treig was known as the Upper Works Railway.

There were some challenges to constructing a railway to serve the access points for the tunnel. Base Camp was at an altitude of 35 feet (11 m), and Adit 10, the first stopping point above Fort William and 2.5 miles (4.0 km) from it was at 640 feet (200 m). This would have required an average gradient of 1 in 22, which was not suitable for an adhesion railway. The railway was laid at an average gradient of 1 in 35 to a point 3.25 miles (5.2 km) from Base Camp, where a junction served a branch that ran back along the hillside to the adit. There were several lengths of 1 in 30 within the first 4.25 miles (6.8 km), and some stretches of 1 in 25. Further along, the railway crossed some peat bogs, and the track was laid on fascines made of brushwood, which led to the track being quite flexible. Three teams of men were employed on the construction, one working upwards from Base Camp, a second working from Central in both directions, and the third working from Fersit in both directions. The teams consisted of six to ten men, working with pickaxes and shovels, and they were able to level 30 to 100 yards (27 to 91 m) of the formation each day.

The Pier Railway was always intended as a permanent feature, and was laid with heavy duty rails, weighing 60 pounds per yard (30 kg/m). However, its route was not ideal, as it ran through some land where it was intended to build the village of Inverlochy for the workers. The railway was reconstructed along a new route, which was slightly longer than the original, at 2 miles (3.2 km), and crossed the West Highland Railway and the A82 road from Fort WIlliam to Inverness on plate grider bridges. The earlier railway had crossed the A82 road at a level crossing. The Upper Works Railway was laid with lighter rails, weighing 30 to 35 pounds per yard (15 to 17 kg/m), as it was intended to be a temporary feature. Large teams of men were employed to build trestle bridges using local timber over the many streams which crossed the path of the railway. Two locations were unsuitable for such bridges, and Bridge 15 over the Allt Leachdach between Central and Adit 5 consisted of a 54-foot (16 m) steel span, supported by concrete pillars at either side of the ravine. Bridge 27 near Adit 6 was of similar construction, with a 40-foot (12 m) steel span over the Allt Choimhlidh. Both had timber trestles to link the centre span to the banks.

There was also a 2 ft (610 mm) gauge railway, which was built inside the tunnel to allow spoil to be removed, and later to carry materials for lining the tunnel. It was mostly single track, but emerged into the open air at adits and the portals, where sidings were built to allow shunting of full and empty spoil wagons. At shafts 1, 2 and 7, spoil was removed from the tunnel by hoists. The tunnel railway crossed the Upper Works Railway on the level near Adit 5, and there were 2 ft gauge inclines from the mouths of Adits 3, 4 and 6 up to the level of the Upper Works Railway. Once the tunnel was completed, the railway was removed, but at one time it was about 20 miles (32 km) long.

The Upper Works Railway was originally intended as a temporary feature. Later, a decision was made to retain it for the delivery and despatch of materials and to assist with the maintenance of the tunnel.

== Description of railway ==
The principal location on the railway was the factory area (or 'Base Camp' prior to its opening), where there were various facilities such as a locomotive and speeder shed. Some of the sidings here were of mixed gauge (3 ft / 914 mm narrow gauge and 4 ft 8 1/2 in / 1,435 mm standard gauge).

The railway as a whole comprised a network of lines as follows:

=== Pier railway ===
The pier railway, built to enable construction materials to be brought in, ran 1.75 mi (2.82 km) from a pier on Loch Linnhe to "Base Camp", to the north and north-west of the factory site. The first section was double track, and crossed the Water of Nevis. This river was later diverted to enter the River Lochy further upstream, when a new short channel was cut which crossed under the railway where the double track ended. The Pier Railway crossed over the Mallaig Extension Railway of the London and North Eastern Railway to the north of Fort William Junction, which was known as Mallaig Junction at the time, crossed the A82 road at a level crossing, and then crossed the West Highland Railway. Base Camp consisted of a network of tracks serving buildings which were used as a plumber's shop, a compressor house, a fitting shop and store, a general store, an oil store, a wagon repair shop and a blacksmith's shop. There was also a locomotive shed and a control office, while close by were huts to accommodate 700 men. The Upper Works Railway started near the control office.

This arrangement lasted until about 1939. When the new Pier Railway was built, it turned to the east at the end of the double track section from the pier, and crossed the Fort William line to the south of Mallaig Junction. A small section of the A82 road was diverted further to the west, to allow the railway to cross it on a bridge and then follow it until it turned to the east just before the road crossed over the West Highland line. As it approached the factory, it passed a compound for storing aluminium ingots, and the carbon factory which was built in 1937. A new shed for steam locomotives was built next to carbon factory in 1958, to replace one close to the main factory. The Upper Works Railway then started at the south-west corner of the factory, and ran along the south side of the factory. The pier railway was used for the delivery of alumina to the works and the despatch of finished aluminium ingots, which were shipped to Runcorn on the Manchester Ship Canal. Construction of the permanent pier railway commenced in 1927. The bridge that crossed the West Highland Railway is still extant, although the embankment leading to it on the eastern side was removed in 2019.

It had been the intention that the permanent pier railway would be worked by electric traction, supplied by overhead lines, but this was never implemented. In addition, the bridges and embankments were built wide enough for double track, but only the first section from the pier was doubled, and the rest remained single track throughout its life.

=== Upper Works Railway ===
The Upper Works Railway was by far the longest part of the rail system, running for some 19 miles (31 km) from base camp to the valve shafts located by Loch Treig. The line from the original Pier Railway terminus and that from the new Pier Railway met to the east of the factory. Just before the junction, the new line crossed the downfall pipes D and E on bridge 53, and pipes A, B and C on bridge 52. Between the bridges was the junction with the Portals branch, with twin inclines running besides both sets of pipes up to the portals. A short 2 ft (610 mm) gauge incline ran upwards from the portals to the surge shaft. The twin inclines replaced a temporary incline which ran diagonally across the hillside to the portals. In the 1950s, a new depot for the Upper Works Railway was built to the east of the factory, beyond the junction of the old and new routes. It was known as 'Possil Park', which was also the name of Balfour Beatty's depot in Glasgow, although there was no link between the two sites. The first part of the railway climbed steeply for 4.25 miles (6.8 km) at gradients of 1 in 30 or even 1 in 25. The junction with the branch to Adit 10 was 3.25 miles (5.2 km) from the start of the railway, and was at a height of 500 feet (150 m). The branch ran back along the hillside for 3/4 mile (1.2 km), rising to 640 feet (200 m) by its end.

Most of the bridges on the line were originally timber trestles but all were subsequently rebuilt in steel using suitable scrap material from the factory. Near the middle point of the railway, at a location known as "central", there was a triangle for turning trains.

There were three short branch lines on the Upper Works Railway. The portal incline railway joined the Upper Works Railway close to base camp. It climbed to a height of 550 ft (170 m). Wagons were hauled by an electric winch at the top of the incline, which had a maximum gradient of 1 in 2 1/2. At Adit 10 there was a branch which was 3/4 mi (1.2 km) in length, while the third branch at Adit 7 was 1/2 mi (800 m) in length.

=== Treig–Laggan railway ===
This was a branch line some 3 1/4 mi (5.2 km) in length. Built in 1930, it ran from a junction with the Upper Works Railway to Laggan Dam on Loch Laggan. The branch crossed over the West Highland Railway at Fersit on a 26-span timber trestle bridge. Much of the bridge was gradually filled in to form an embankment. This section also included a short branch to Shaft C, which was 1/2 mi (800 m) in length.

== Closure ==
In October 1971, heavy rainfall caused part of the Upper Works Railway to be washed away, leaving a gap of around 70 ft (20 m) in the track. Following this event, the future of the railway had to be considered. At that time, the Forestry Commission was constructing many access roads in the area. It was therefore decided that further roads should be built, rather than repair the track. However, due to the length of time it took to achieve this, the railway continued to operate for a number of years. Two locomotives and two speeders had been stranded on the far side of the breach from the factory. The railway finally closed in 1977.

== Current status ==
Following closure of the railway, most of the track was lifted, but the steel bridges were mostly left in place. Some odd lengths of track remain in place, particularly on some of the longer bridges.

Some of the 3-foot gauge rolling stock survives. Brazil class 0-4-2ST, 'Sir Murray Morrison', went to the Hampshire Narrow Gauge Society, where much of it was reused as spare parts, while the funnel, cab and chassis were subsequently rebuilt by Alan Keef. The rebuilt locomotive was named 'Dromod', and worked on the Cavan and Leitrim Railway at Dromod from 1994, but in 2019 was at Fowler and Co in Cumbria for rebuilding. Wickham inspection car W6/11-4 is also on the Cavan and Leitrim Railway. A Wickham inspection car and three tippler skips are in the Isle of Man.

In 2005 there was talk of reopening part of the Upper Works Railway as a tourist attraction.

== See also ==
- British industrial narrow-gauge railways

== Bibliography ==
- Howat, Patrick (1980). The Lochaber Narrow Gauge Railway (1st. ed.). Famedram. ISBN 0-905489-43-8.
- Howat, Patrick (2005). The Puggy Line. Narrow Gauge Railway Society. ISBN 978-0-9554326-0-6.
