= Fersit Halt railway station =

Former railway station in Scotland

Fersit Halt Fearsaid Mhòr
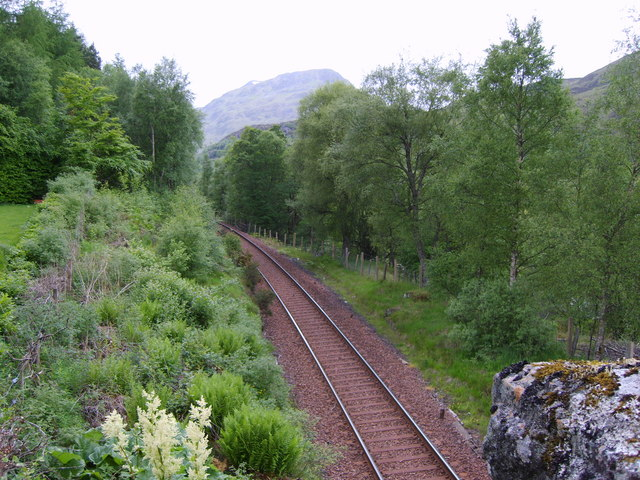
- Remains of the Fersit Halt platform

General information
- Location: Near Loch Treig between Corrour station and Rannoch station, Highland; Scotland
- Coordinates: 56.8654°N 4.7054°W
- Grid reference: NN351781
- Platforms: 1

Other information
- Status: Disused

History
- Original company: London and North Eastern Railway
- Post-grouping: London and North Eastern Railway

Key dates
- 1 August 1931: Opened
- 1 January 1935: Closed

Fersit Halt railway station named after the nearby hamlet of Fersit (Scottish Gaelic: Fearsaid Mhòr), was situated close to Tulloch railway station in Lochaber, Highland council area, Scotland. Fersit was a remote rural temporary private halt at the north end of Loch Treig where workers were housed who worked on the Lochaber hydroelectric scheme. The halt was opened in 1931 by the LNER, it was located near the site of a contractors railway ballast siding.

== History ==
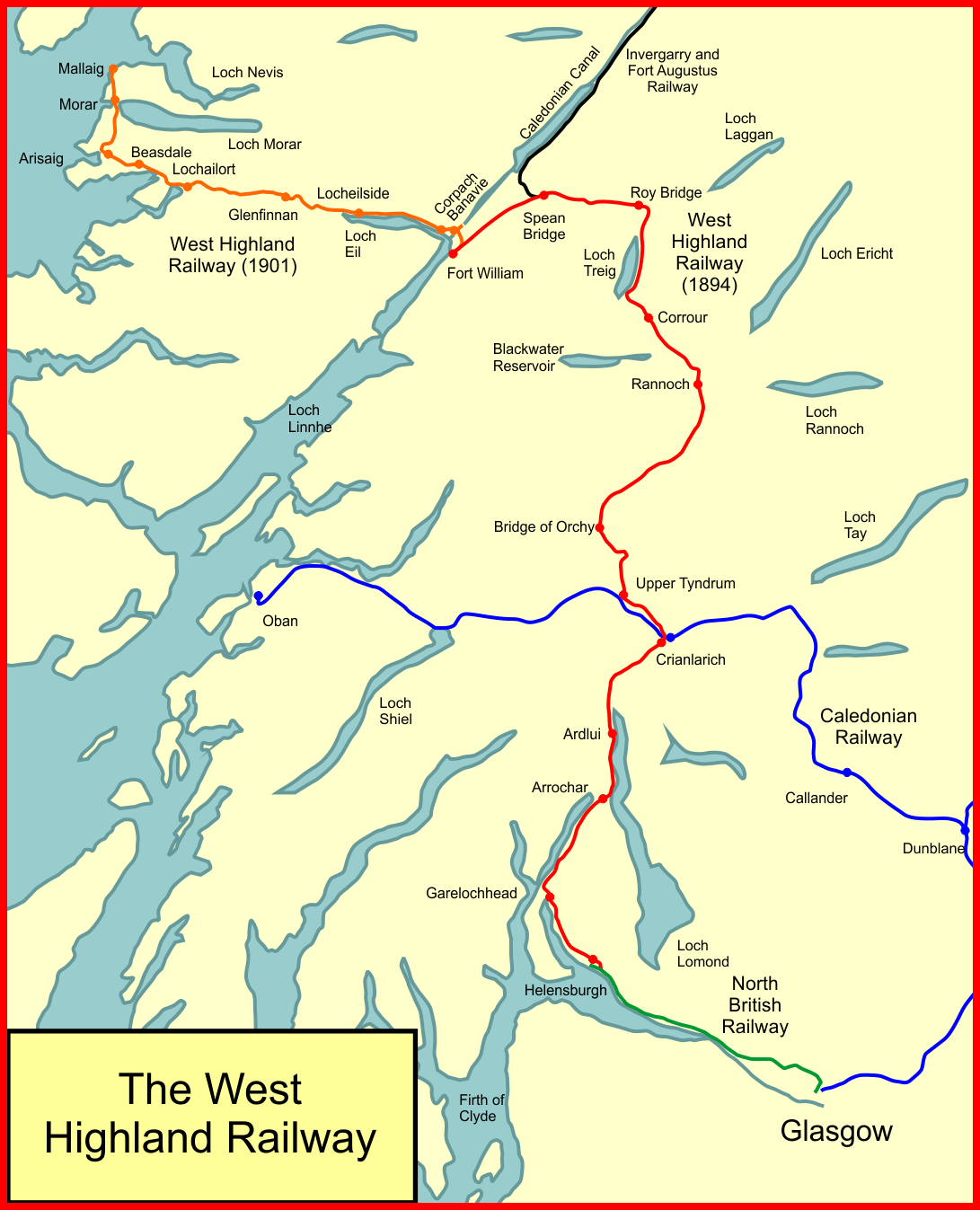
System map of the West Highland Railway

The West Highland Railway opened the line to passengers on 7 August 1894; later it was operated by the North British Railway, until in 1923 it became part of the London and North Eastern Railway. In 1948 the line became part of the Scottish Region of British Railways following nationalisation. Fersit Halt however was opened to serve the navvy encampment and the construction depot for the Lochaber Power Scheme that involved extensive works building dams at Loch Treig and Loch Laggan. A diversion of the original West Highland Railway line route was necessary over a distance of 1.5 miles, the original trackbed is visible beneath the Loch Treig dam.

The original contractors for the line, Lucas and Aird, had constructed a ballast siding at Fersit and several additional sidings were added in the 1930s. The Lochaber Narrow Gauge Railway was built to facilitate construction and this ran into the Fersit sidings area and ran as far as the Loch Laggan dam works.

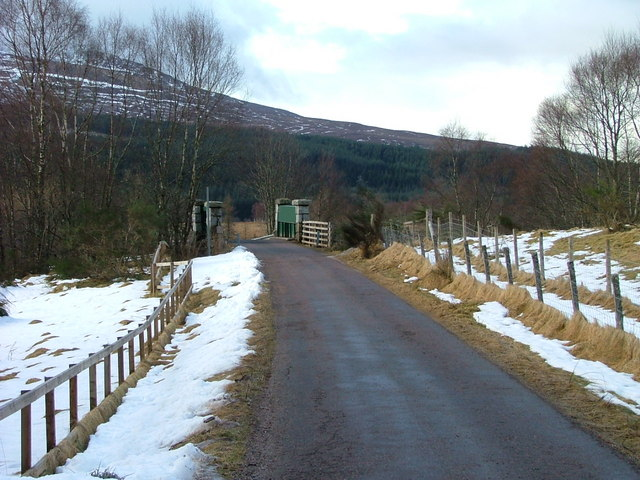
The railway over bridge at Firsit.

Loch Treig dam raised the level of the loch and it serves as the principal reservoir of the whole Lochaber hydroelectric scheme. About 1000 men were employed on the construction of the dams until completion of the project in 1934 and those working at Loch Treig were housed at Fersit that lay roughly equidistant between the dam sites. The main contractor was Balfour Beatty & Co. Ltd.

Constructed in 1930 by Balfour Beatty, the Treig to Laggan railway branch line ran from the Upper Works Railway some 3.25 miles (5.23 km) to Laggan Dam on Loch Laggan, crossing over the Fersit section of the West Highland Railway on a timber trestle bridge that was later replaced by an earth embankment.

== Infrastructure ==
The halt was composed of a single platform on the western side of the line to the south of the present over bridge and parts of this remained in place as late as 2016. The narrow gauge line had loading and access sidings that lay parallel to the standard gauge served cement shed and entered the store and fitting sheds. A single LNER cottage stood to the east of the through standard gauge line. The halt is marked on the 1934 OS map of Lochaber.

== The West Highland Line ==
Preceding station	National Rail	Following station
Corrour	ScotRail; West Highland Line	Tulloch
Corrour	Caledonian Sleeper; Highland Caledonian Sleeper	Tulloch
	Historical railways	
Corrour	North British Railway; West Highland Railway	Tulloch
