= Chno Dearg =

Mountain in Scotland

Coordinates: 56.830086°N 4.660831°W

- An Crò Dearg
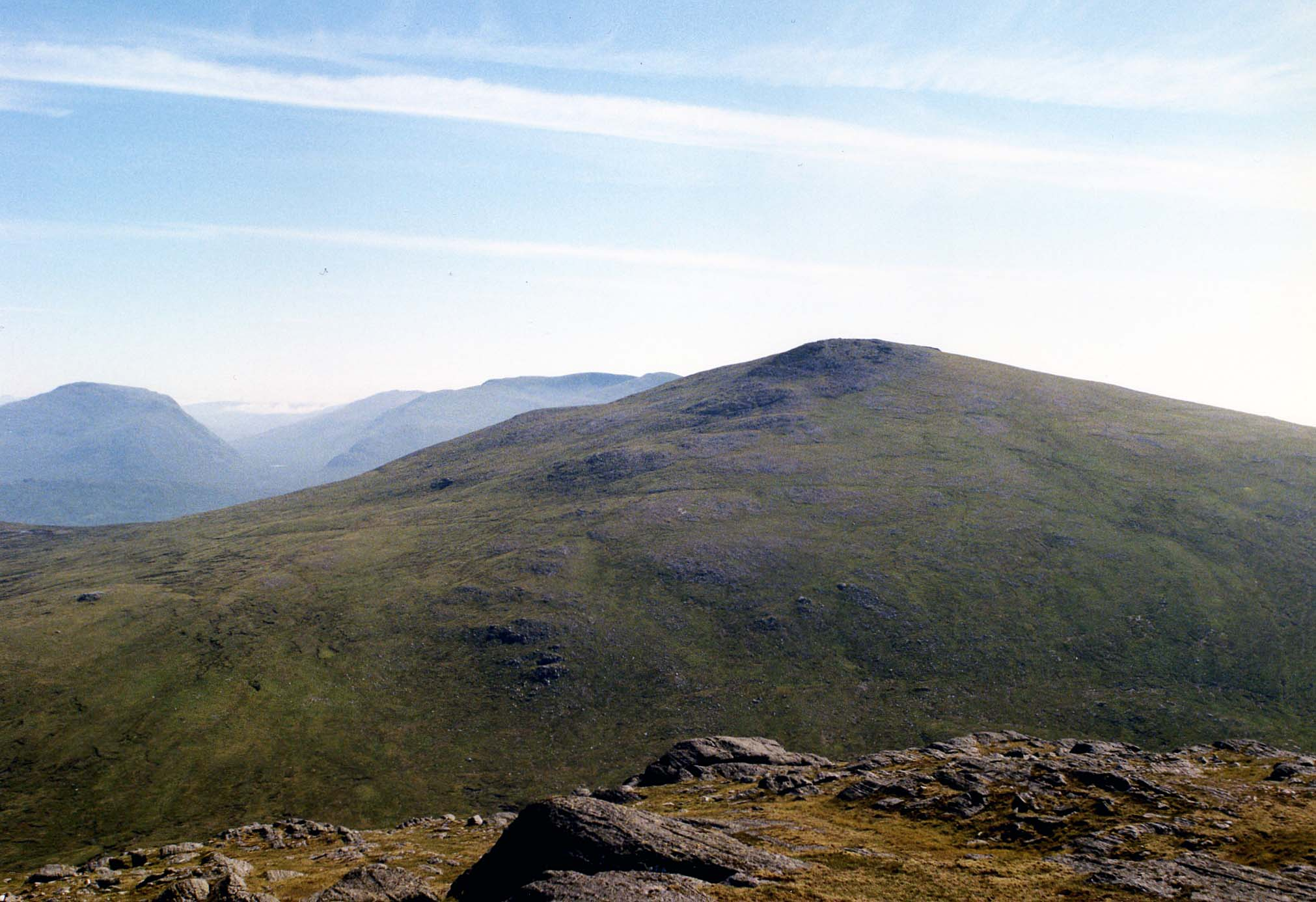
- Chno Dearg seen from Stob Coire Sgriodain, two km to the west.

Highest point
- Elevation: 1,046 m (3,432 ft)
- Prominence: 649 m (2,129 ft)
- Listing: Munro, Marilyn

Naming
- English translation: red nut or red hill
- Language of name: Gaelic

Geography
- Location: Lochaber, Highland, Scotland
- Parent range: Grampians
- OS grid: NN377740
- Topo map: OS Landranger 41, OS Explorer 393

Listed summits of Chno Dearg
Name	Grid ref	Height	Status
Meall Garbh	NN640509	976 m (3202 ft)	Munro Top

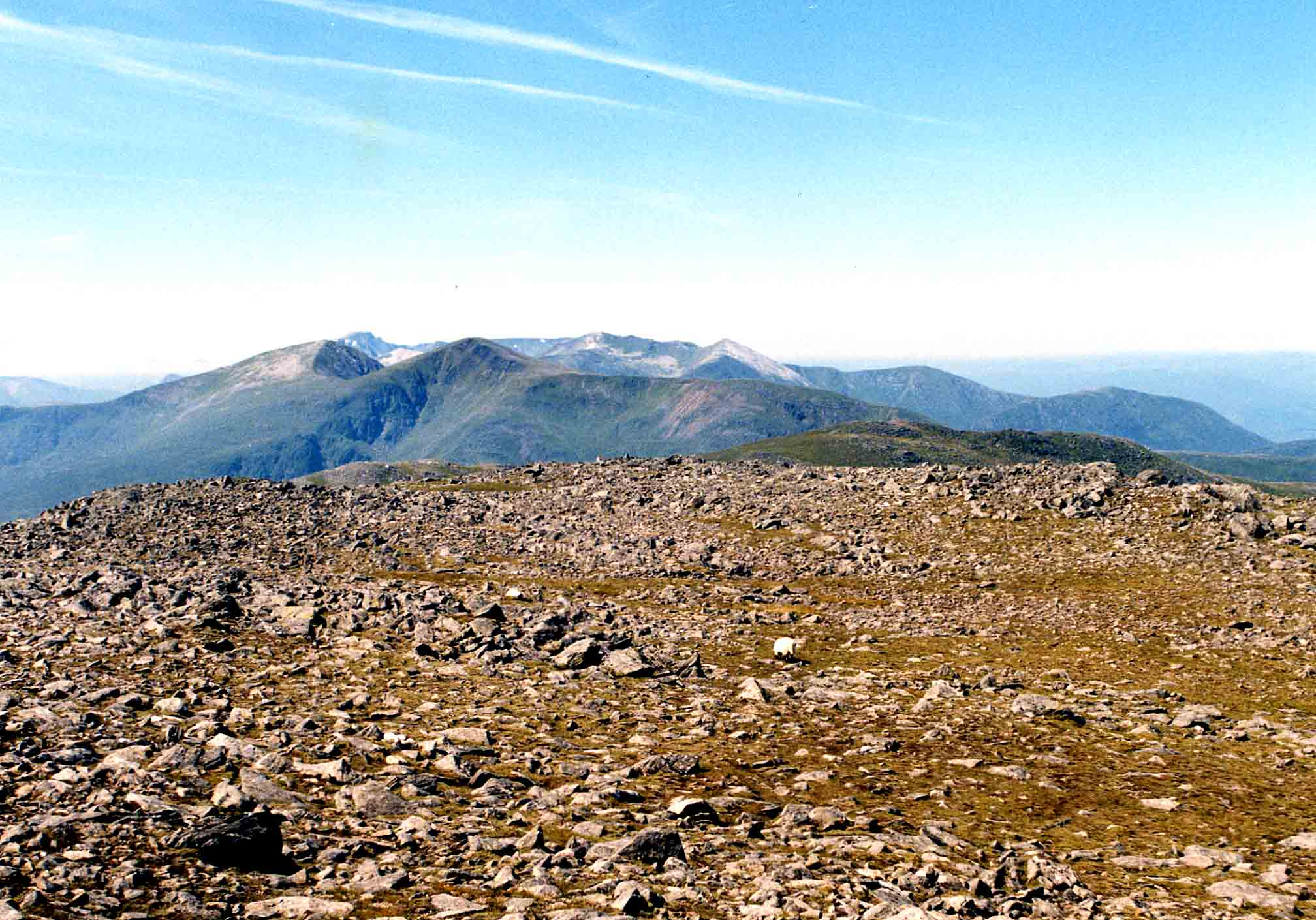
Looking west from the summit over the “Easains” and The Grey Corries to Ben Nevis.

Chno Dearg (Scottish Gaelic: An Crò Dearg) is a mountain in the Lochaber area of the Scottish Highlands. It overlooks Glen Spean to the north and Loch Treig to the west. With a height of 1,046 metres (3,432 ft), it is classed as a Munro.

== Name ==
The name "Chno Dearg" was suggested to come from Gaelic Cnò Dearg ([krɔː dʒɛrək], English approximation: kraw-JERR-ək), "red nut"; the red referring to the profusion of heather on the hill. However, Ainmean-Àite na h-Alba says the spelling "Chno Dearg" is an Ordnance Survey mistake. Earlier maps give the name as Cnoc Dearg ([krɔxk dʒɛrək], English approximation: krok-JERR-ək), "red hill".

== Landscape ==
Chno Dearg is east of Loch Treig in the high ground between the loch and Strath Ossian. It reaches a height of 1046 metres (3432 feet) and qualifies as a Munro and a Marilyn. It is not regarded as a particularly striking hill, being described in the SMCs Munro guide as "a rounded and featureless hill".

Chno Dearg has a considerable topographic prominence of 649 metres, being surrounded by the deep glens of Glen Spean, Loch Treig and Strath Ossian, and its summit is a fine viewpoint especially for the Creag Meagaidh group of hills to the northeast. Another feature of the mountain is its appeal to the ski mountaineer, with its sweeping northern slopes offering a continuous five km run with 750 metres of descent from the summit.

Chno Dearg's expansive northern flank falls gradually to Glen Spean and the shores of Loch Laggan, the lower part being covered with an extensive forestry plantation. These northern slopes can be boggy at times with numerous small streams, and contain the subsidiary top of Meall Chaorach (815 metres) which is 1.5 km from the main summit. On the western side of the hill is Coire an Lochain, a shallow hollow with gentle slopes which contains Lochan Coire an Lochain.

The mountain's main ridge goes southwest from the summit to a col with a height of 923 metres. Here it splits, with one spur swinging round the head of Coire an Lochain to go eventually north and link to the adjoining Munro of Stob Coire Sgriodain. The other spur continues southerly to link to Meall Garbh (976 metres) which is listed as a “top” in Munro's Tables and has steep crags on its eastern flank. The south side of Chno Dearg contains the steep-sided Coire nan Cnamh which falls precipitously to the glen of the Allt Feith Thuill, a tributary of the River Ossian. All drainage from the mountain reaches the River Spean to the north where it flows to the west coast of Scotland.

== Climbing ==
Chno Dearg is usually climbed from the hamlet of Fersit (NN350784); as a rule the adjacent Munro of Stob Coire Sgriodain is also included in the ascent. The route from Fersit offers a natural round of Coire an Lochain, taking in both Munros, with a brief detour to take in the “top” of Meall Garbh. However the nearness of the West Highland Line in the area offers walkers the alternative of starting from Corrour railway station and climbing Beinn na Lap first and then continuing north over Chno Dearg and Stob Coire Sgriodain to finish at Tulloch railway station to catch the evening train.
