= Creag Meagaidh =

Mountain in the Scottish Highlands

Creag Mèagaidh
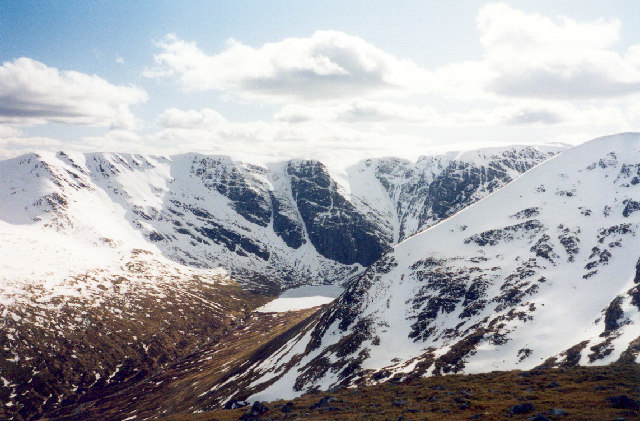
- Coire Ardair and Creag Meagaidh

Highest point
- Elevation: 1,130 m (3,710 ft)
- Prominence: 867 m (2,844 ft); Ranked 18th in British Isles
- Parent peak: Ben Nevis
- Listing: Marilyn, Munro

Naming
- Language of name: Gaelic
- Pronunciation: Scottish Gaelic: [ˈkʰɾʲek ˈmekɪ]

Geography
- Location: Glen Spean, Scotland
- Parent range: Grampian Mountains
- OS grid: NN418875
- Topo map: OS Landranger 34, 42

Listed summits of Creag Meagaidh
Name	Grid ref	Height	Status
Càrn Liath	NN472903	1,006 metres (3,301 ft)	Munro
Stob Poite Coire Ardair	NN428888	1,054 metres (3,458 ft)	Munro

Creag Meagaidh (Scottish Gaelic: Creag Mèagaidh) is a mountain on the northern side of Glen Spean in the Highlands of Scotland. It is a complex mountain, made up of a flat summit plateau, with five ridges spreading out from it, overlooking five deep corries; it is most famed for the cliffs surrounding the corrie of Coire Ardair on the north-eastern face. These crags are a renowned venue for ice climbing. Creag Meagaidh rises to 1,130 metres (3,710 ft).

The neighbouring peaks of Stob Poite Coire Ardair and Càrn Liath are sometimes called the Creag Meagaidh range. The Creag Meagaidh massif is part of Creag Meagaidh National Nature Reserve. The reserve covers 3,940 hectares, extending from the shores of Loch Laggan to the high summit plateau of Creag Meagaidh. The reserve was designated in 1986 and is owned and managed by NatureScot. Creag Meagaidh is also designated as a Special Protection Area, and the number of grazing animals is controlled. This has led to a regrowth of the native woodland of birch, alder, willow, rowan and oak. The site is also an important breeding ground for many species of birds, in particular the dotterel.

== Climbing ==
All three peaks in the range may be climbed from Aberarder on the A86 road by initially following the path leading up Coire Ardair, before striking north to the summit of Càrn Liath. A circuit of the glen may be made by returning to Aberarder by way of Creag Meagaidh's east ridge. The most direct route to the summit of Creag Meagaidh ascends from the head of the corrie to reach a narrow gap between the crags known as The Window. The Window forms the bealach between Creag Meagaidh and Stob Poite Coire Ardair. Creag Meagaidh may also be climbed from Moy to the southeast.

These crags are a renowned venue for winter and ice climbing, although being somewhat vegetated they are less suited to summer climbing.

In 2016 a person died in an avalanche on Creag Meagaidh and a second person was taken to hospital in a serious condition.

== Nature and conservation ==
=== Flora and fauna ===
Creag Meagaidh National Nature Reserve
- IUCN category IV (habitat/species management area)
- An information board at Creag Meagaidh National Nature Reserve

- Location within Highland
- Location: Highland, Scotland
- Coordinates: 56.95162°N 4.60274°W
- Area: 39.5 km^{2} (15.3 sq mi)
- Established: 1986
- Governing body: NatureScot
- Website: Creag Meagaidh National Nature Reserve

A number of nationally important plant species can be found at Creag Meagaidh, including woolly willow, wavy meadow grass, highland saxifrage, bog orchid and Scots pine. Over 120 species of lichen have also been recorded. The summit of the massif is carpeted in moss heath and stiff sedge, being one of the largest areas of woolly fringemoss heath in the UK. The cliffs above Coire Ardair have mostly avoided grazing and support a number of rare species such as alpine foxtail, alpine lady-fern, Norwegian cudweed, downy willow and sibbaldia.

Over 150 species of invertebrates have been recorded on the summit plateau. This number include rarities such as the large wolf spider, which within Scotland is found only on one or two of the highest summits. One species of fly that has been identified at Creag Meagaidh, Spilogona trigonata, is not found anywhere else in Britain, being generally restricted to Scandinavia and North America.

According to NatureScot, 137 different bird species have been recorded within the Reserve. Of these, one particular species of note is the dotterel, which is one of Britain's rarest birds: the upper part of the mountain (above 750 m) is consequently designated as a Special Protection Area for this species. Snow bunting and golden plover also breed on the higher heaths and summit plateau, while red grouse and greenshank are often seen on the lower slopes. The denser woodland on the lower part of the reserve also provides a home for chaffinch, willow warbler, tree pipit and wren.

There are three species of deer found at Creag Meagaidh NNR: red, roe and sika. Deer management to reduce numbers takes place at Creag Meagaidh in order to facilitate woodland regeneration. Mountain hares are common on the higher parts of the reserve, whilst pine marten and otter can occasionally be found at lower altitudes. There has been only one sighting of the Scottish wildcat in recent years.

=== Conservation designations ===
Creag Meagaidh has several overlapping conservation designations, testament to its diverse range of habitats and important features: it is a National Nature Reserve (NNR), a Site of Special Scientific Interest (SSSI), a Special Protection Area (SPA) and a Special Area of Conservation (SAC). The Creag Meagaidh National Nature Reserve is classified as a Category IV protected area by the International Union for Conservation of Nature.

== History ==
The earliest historical records for Creag Meagaidh are from the seventeenth and early eighteenth centuries, when the area was farmed by tenants who grew crops on the lower slopes and grazed cattle on the higher ground during the summer. Following the Jacobite rising of 1745 the then owner, Ewen MacPherson of Cluny, was deprived of his estate, which was then managed on behalf of the Crown by the Commissioners for Forfeited Estates. The commission began the process of evicting the tenants and consolidating the holdings into a single sheep farm, and by 1790 there were around 20,000 sheep in the parish of Laggan. In 1784 Creag Meagaidh was restored to the Macpherson family.

The first recorded ascent of Creag Meagaidh is thought to have been made in 1786 by Thomas Thornton, who described the view from the summit in his book, "Sporting Tour".

By the early twentieth century the estate was being managed for sporting interests (deer stalking, fishing and grouse shooting), alongside sheep farming and forestry. The construction of the Laggan Dam (completed 1934) as part of the Lochaber hydroelectric scheme led to a reduction in the amount of grazing land in the area, causing an increase in deer numbers at Creag Meagaidh. By the 1970s sheep farming had largely ceased, and deer stalking had become the main activity on the estate. In 1983 the estate was sold to Fountain Forestry, who proposed to plant much of the area with Sitka spruce plantations. There was public opposition to this plan, and in 1985 the estate was sold to the Nature Conservancy Council (predecessor to NatureScot), who declared the area a national nature reserve in 1986.

== Gallery ==
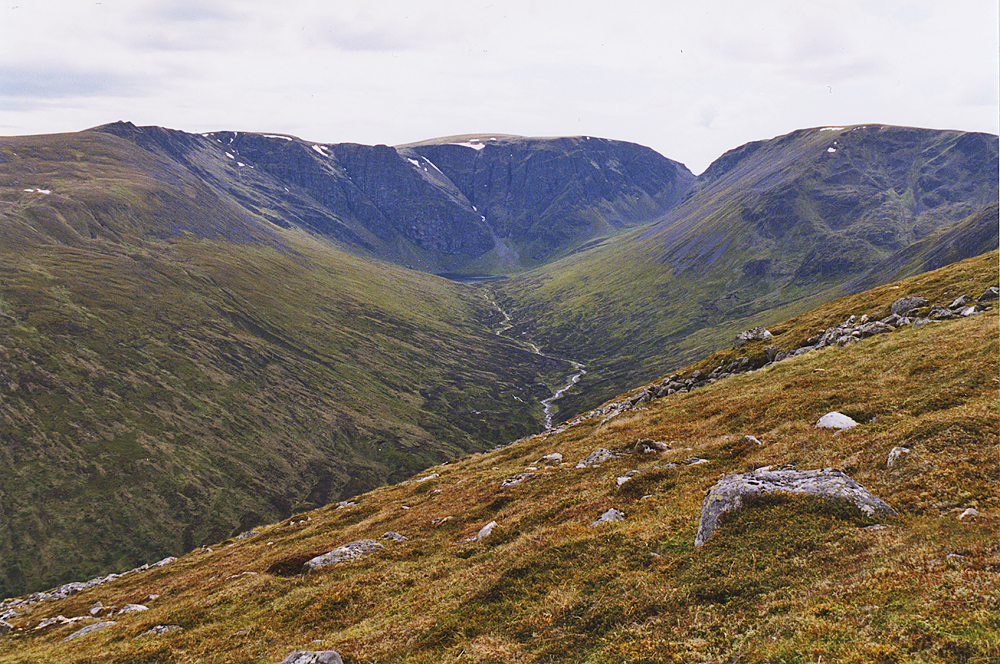
Creag Meagaidh and the Coire Ardair seen from Càrn Liath

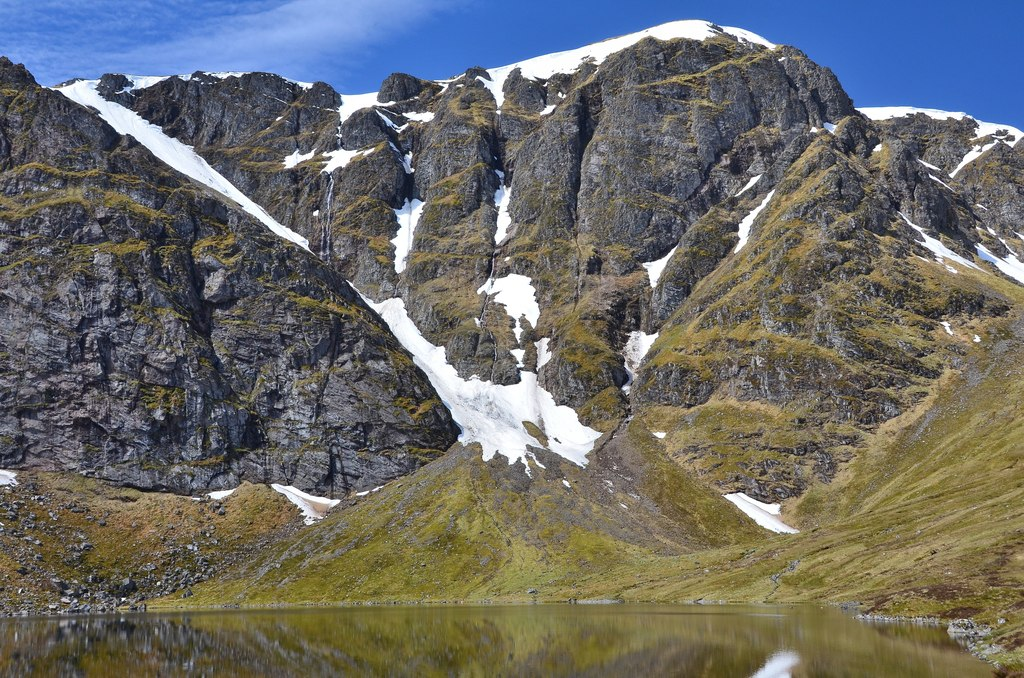
A closer view of the cliffs overlooking Coire Ardair

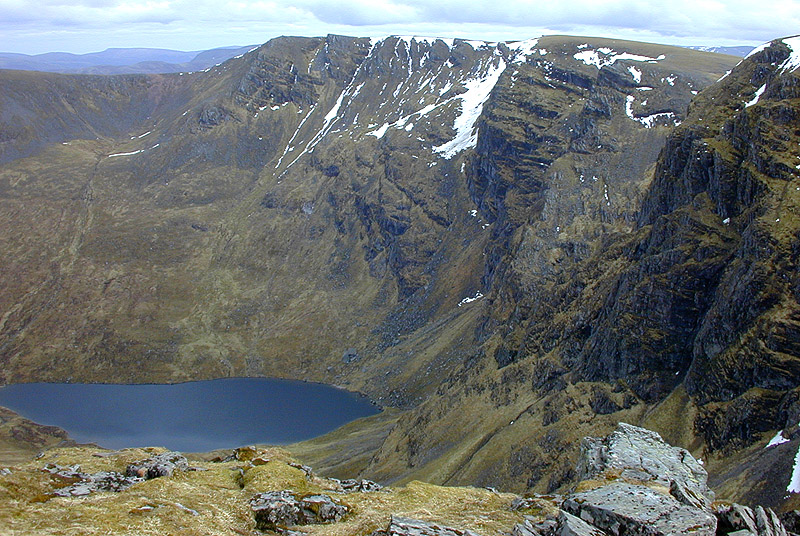
Another view of the cliffs

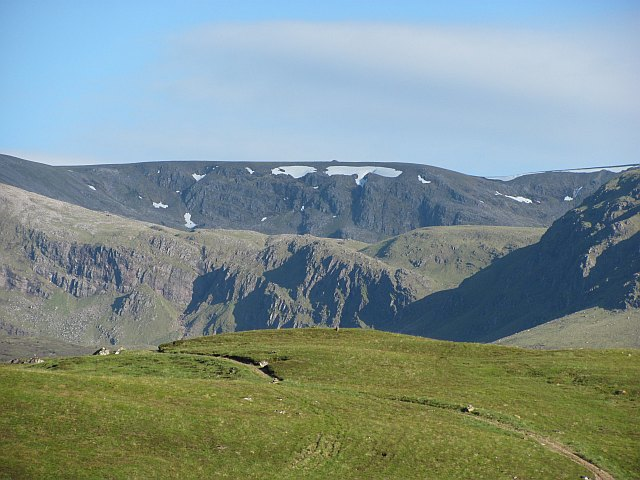
The north side of Creag Meagaidh

== See also ==
- List of Munro mountains
- Mountains and hills of Scotland
