= Fort William, Scotland =

Town in the Highlands of Scotland

Coordinates: 56.8198°N 5.1052°W

Fort William: Scottish Gaelic: An Gearasdan
- Town
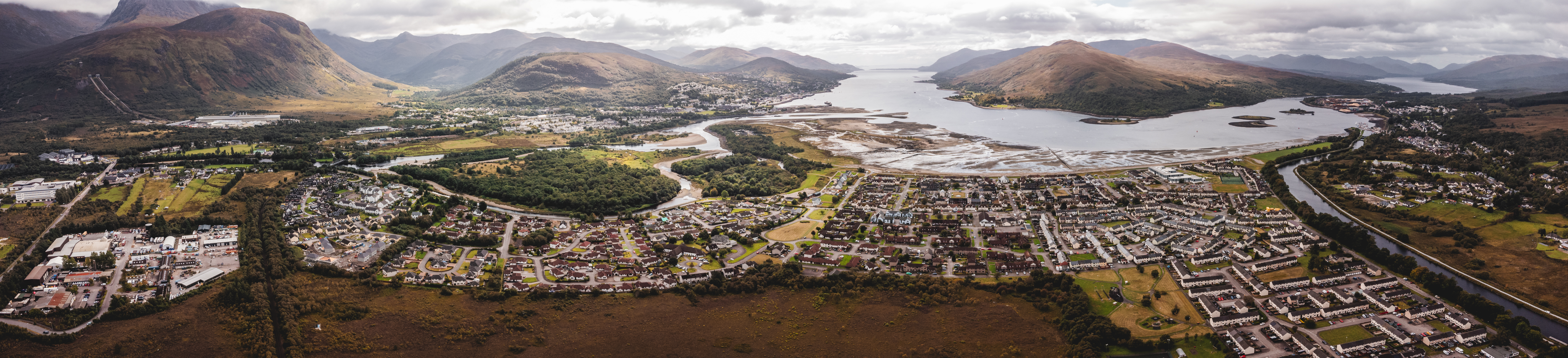
- Overview of Fort William

- Location within the Highland council area
- Population: 15,757 (2025)
- OS grid reference: NN 10584 74114
  - Edinburgh: 134 mi (216 km)
  - London: 512 mi (824 km)
- Community council: Fort William
- Council area: Highland
- Country: Scotland
- Sovereign state: United Kingdom
- Post town: FORT WILLIAM
- Postcode district: PH33
- Dialling code: 01397
- Police: Scotland
- Fire: Scottish
- Ambulance: Scottish
- UK Parliament: Inverness, Skye and West Ross-shire
- Scottish Parliament: Skye, Lochaber and Badenoch

Fort William (Note: Scottish Gaelic: An Gearasdan ([ən ˈkʲɛɾəs̪t̪ən]), "the garrison"; formerly Baile Mairi and Gearasdan dubh Inbhir-Lochaidh, "the black garrison of Inverlochy"; Scots: The Fort, formerly Maryburgh) is a town in the Lochaber region of the Scottish Highlands, located at the head of Loch Linnhe.

At the 2011 census, Fort William had a population of 15,757, making it the second-largest settlement in both the Highland council area and in the Scottish Highlands as a whole; only the city of Inverness has a larger population.

Fort William is a major tourist centre with Glen Coe just to the south, Ben Nevis and Aonach Mòr to the east, and Glenfinnan to the west. It is the start and end of the Road to the Isles. It is a huge centre for hillwalking and climbing due to its proximity to Ben Nevis, the largest mountain in Scotland and the United Kingdom, and many other Munros. It is also known for its nearby downhill mountain bike track.

It forms the terminus of both the West Highland Way (a walk/cycleway running to Milngavie) and the Great Glen Way (a walk/cycleway running to Inverness).

Around 726 people (7.33% of the population) can speak Scottish Gaelic.

== Origins ==
The earliest recorded settlement on the site is a Cromwellian wooden fort, known as the Garrison of Inverlochy, built in 1654 as a base for the New Model Army to "pacify" Clan Cameron after the Wars of the Three Kingdoms. The post-1688 revolution fort was named Fort William after William of Orange, who ordered that it be built to control some of the Scottish clans. The settlement that grew around it was called Maryburgh, after his wife Mary II of England. This settlement was later renamed Gordonsburgh, and then Duncansburgh before being renamed Fort William, this time after Prince William, Duke of Cumberland.

There have been various suggestions over the years to rename the town (for example, to Invernevis).

The origin of the Gaelic name for Fort William, An Gearasdan, is not recorded but could be a loanword from the English garrison, having entered common usage some time after the royal garrison was established during the reign of William of Orange, or perhaps after the earlier Cromwellian fort.

== History ==
Historically, the Fort William area of Lochaber was old Clan Chattan and then Clan Cameron country, and there were a number of mainly Cameron settlements in the area (such as Blarmacfoldach). Before the building of the fort, Inverlochy was the main local settlement and was also the site of two battles—the first Battle of Inverlochy in 1431 and the second Battle of Inverlochy in 1645.

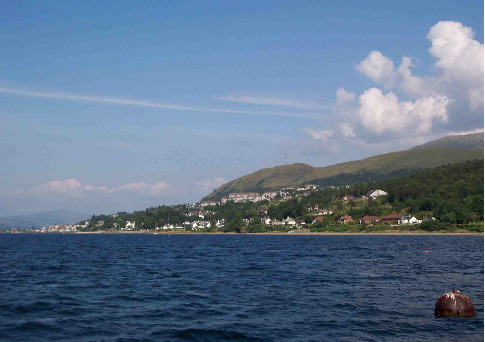
Fort William from Loch Linnhe.

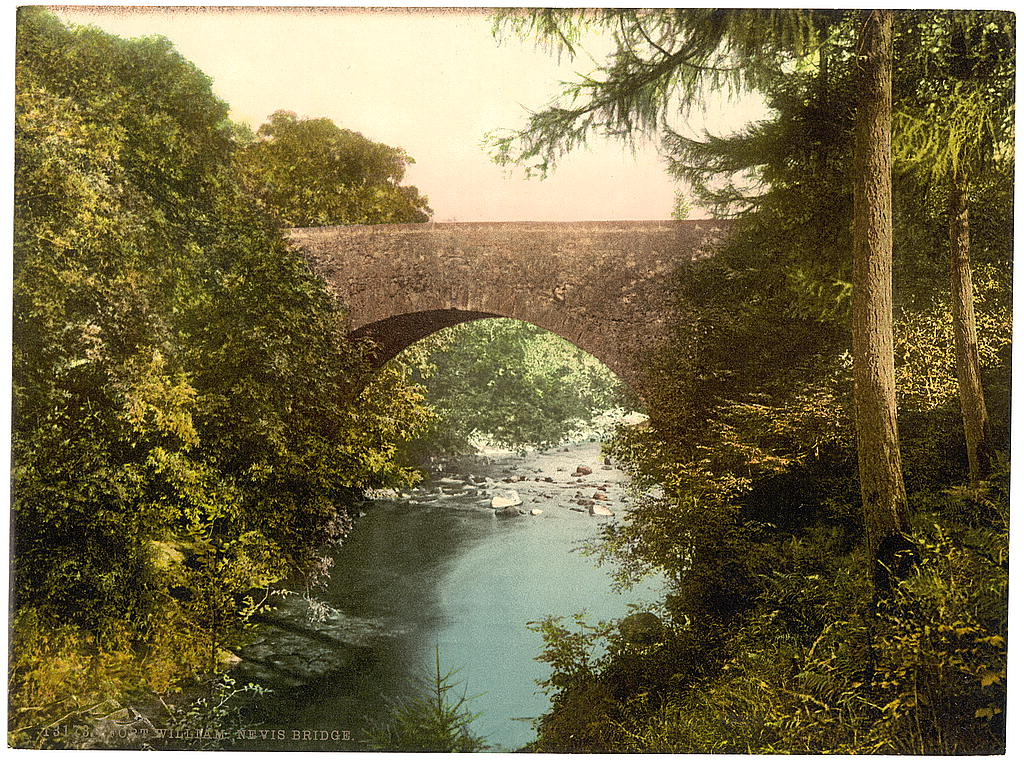
"Nevis Bridge, Fort William, Scotland", ca. 1890–1900.

The town grew in size as a settlement when the fort was constructed to control the population after Oliver Cromwell's invasion during the Wars of the Three Kingdoms, and then to suppress the Jacobite risings after the 1688 overthrow of the House of Stuart.

During the 1745 Jacobite Rising, known as the Forty-Five, Fort William was besieged for two weeks by the Jacobite forces, from 20 March to 3 April 1746. However, although the Jacobites had captured both of the other forts in the chain of three Great Glen fortifications (Fort Augustus and the original Fort George), they failed to take Fort William. Fort William Sheriff Court held its first hearing in 1794.

In 1934, the Laggan Dam on the River Spean was completed as part of the Lochaber hydroelectric scheme by Balfour Beatty for the British Aluminium Company. The supervising engineers were the firm of C. S. Meik and William Halcrow, now known as the Halcrow Group. The dam was built to power the aluminium smelter.

During the Second World War, Fort William was the home of HMS St Christopher, which was a training base for Royal Navy Coastal Forces.

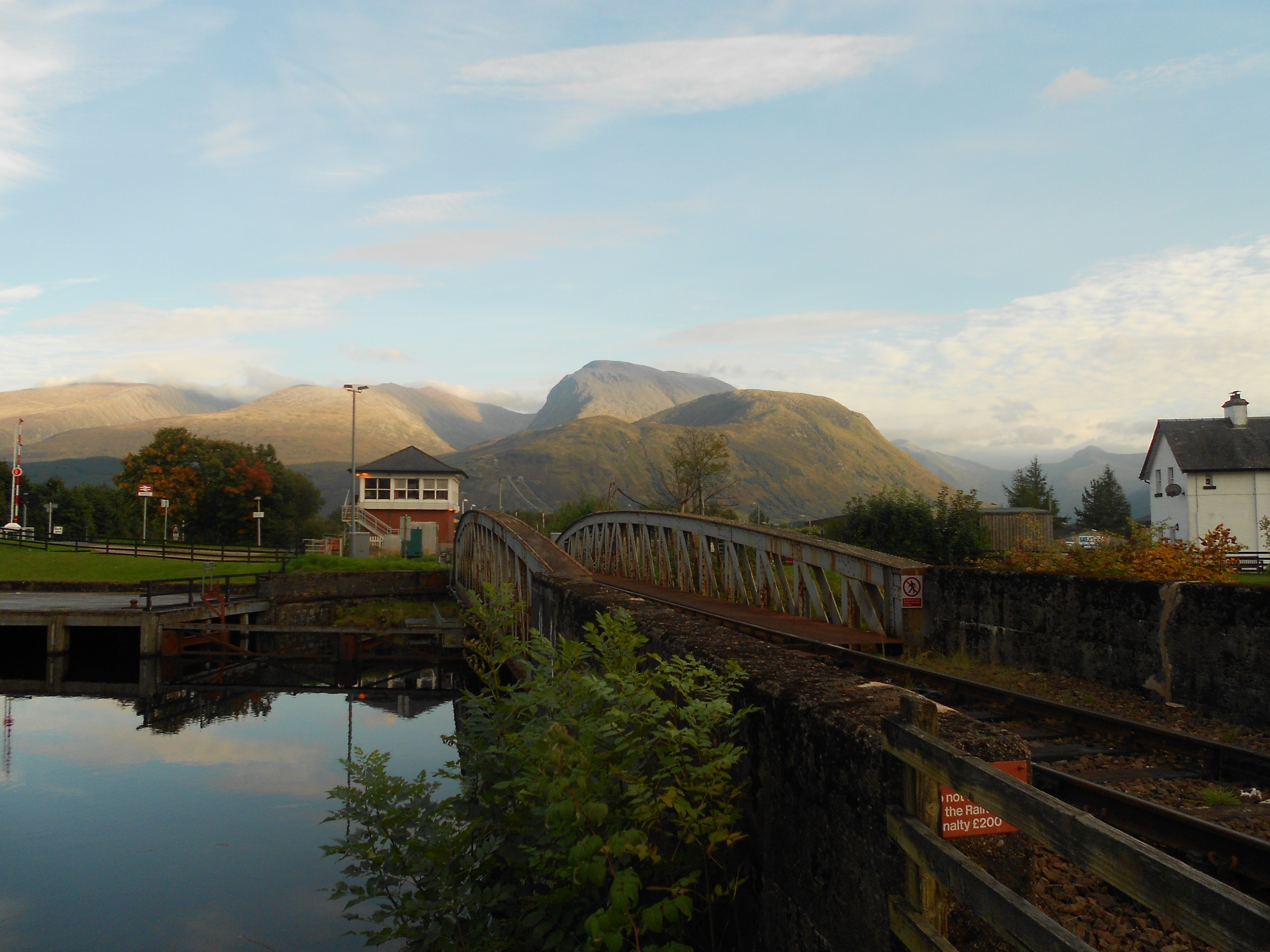
Ben Nevis viewed from Neptune's Staircase

Fort William Town Hall, which started life as an 18th-century church, was converted for municipal use in 1881. It was burnt down in 1975.

=== Proposed development ===
A "waterfront" development was proposed by the council in 2007, but failed due to lack of public support. The development would have included a hotel, shops, and housing. The proposed development was slated to take 7 years by the local council, but opponents of the project said that it was unlikely to be completed before 2020. It was announced in April 2010 that the project had been abandoned.

== Geography ==
Fort William viewed from Corpach

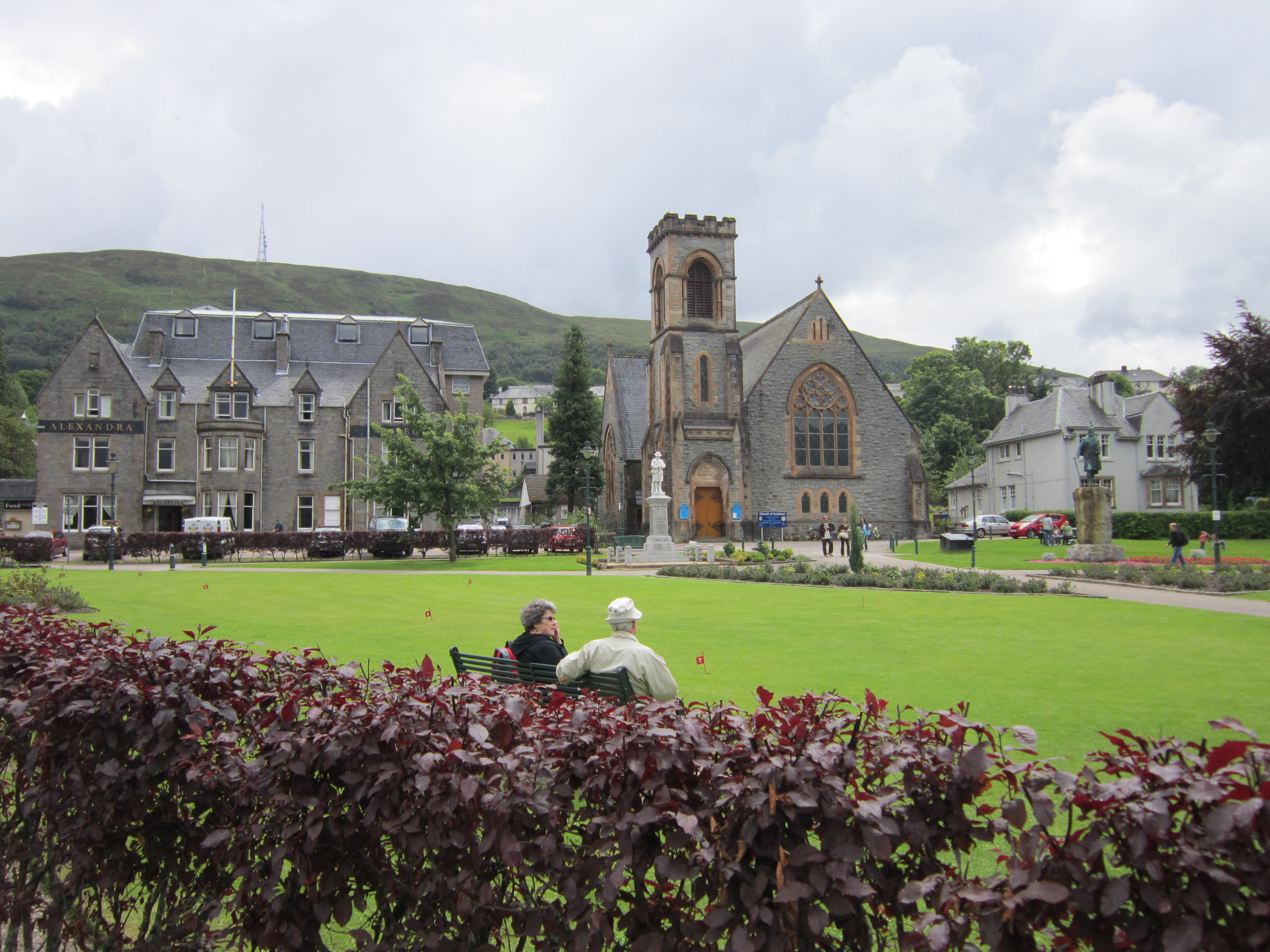
Fort William Parade and Duncansburgh MacIntosh Parish Church

The town lies at the southern end of the Great Glen. Fort William lies near the head of Loch Linnhe, one of Scotland's longest sea lochs, beside the mouth of the rivers Nevis and Lochy. They join in the intertidal zone and briefly become one river before discharging to the sea. The town and its suburbs are surrounded by mountains. Its suburbs of Lochyside, Caol and Corpach are on the shore of Loch Eil. It is close to Ben Nevis, the highest mountain in the British Isles, Glen Nevis, and the settlement of Achnaphubuil, which is on the opposite shore of the loch. The original railway station, which was at the south end of the town, was opened on 7 August 1894.

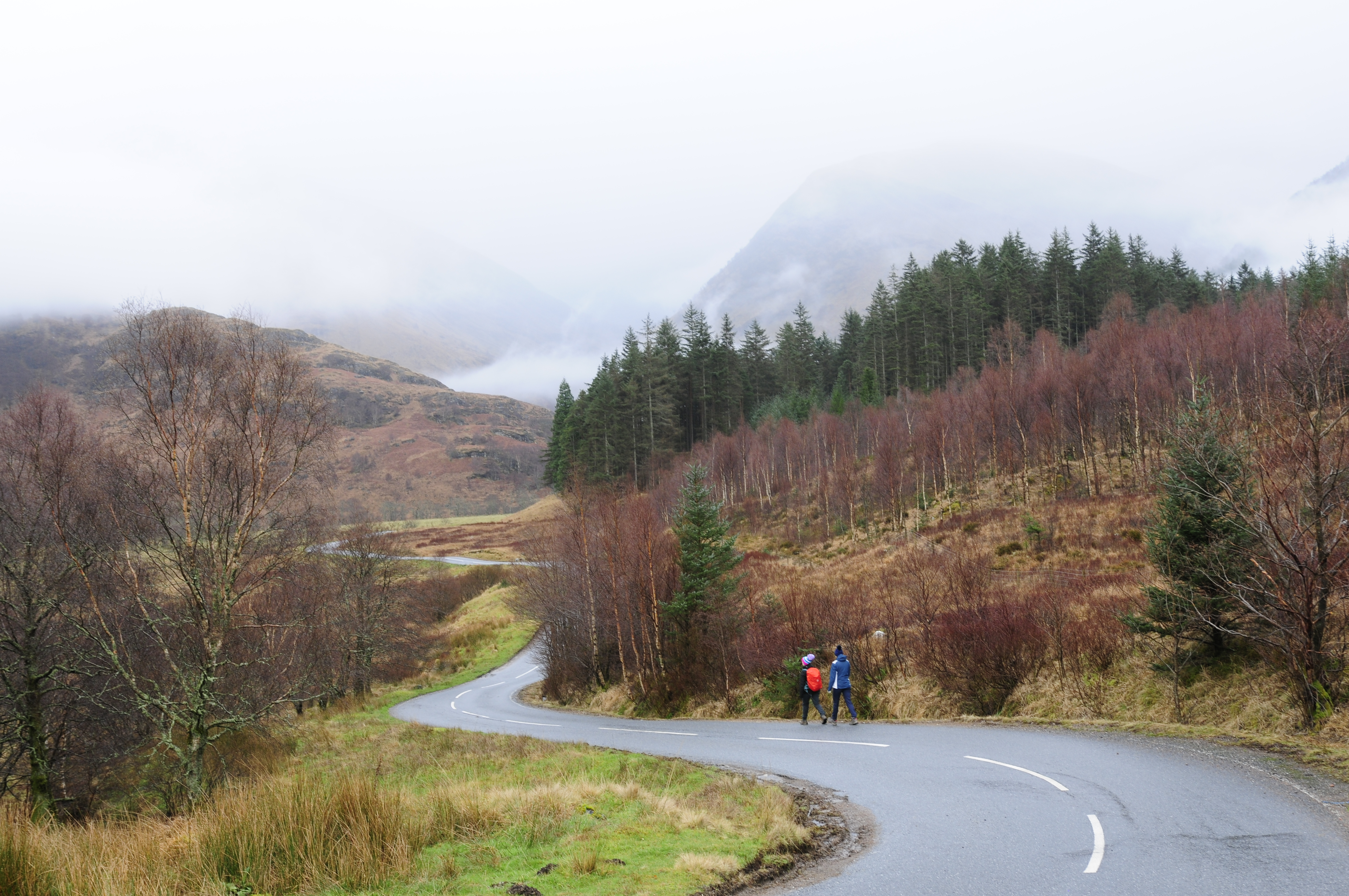
Countryside just outside of Fort William

The town is centred on the High Street, which was pedestrianised in the 1990s. Off this, there are several squares: Monzie Square (named after the Cameron Campbells of Monzie, Perthshire, former landowners in the town); Station Square, where the long-since demolished railway station used to be; Gordon Square (named after the Gordons, who in the late 18th century owned land where the town now stands, when the town was named Gordonsburgh); and Cameron Square—formerly known as Town Hall Square. There is also Fraser Square, which is not so square-like, since it now opens out into Middle Street, but which still houses the Imperial Hotel.

The main residential areas of the town are unseen from the High Street and the A82 main road. Upper Achintore and the Plantation spread steeply uphill from above the high street.

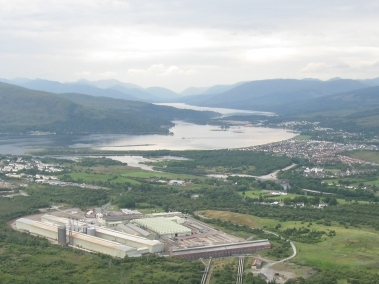
Inverlochy, aluminium plant, Corpach and Loch Eil

Inverlochy, Claggan, An-Aird, Lochyside, Caol, Banavie and Corpach outwith (i.e. outside) the town are the other main residential areas. These areas are built on much flatter land than the town.

Fort William is the northern end of the West Highland Way, a long-distance route which runs 95 miles (153 kilometres) through the Scottish Highlands to Milngavie, on the outskirts of Glasgow, and the start/end point of the Great Glen Way, which runs between Fort William and Inverness.

Glenfinnan, 17 miles (27 kilometres) away, is home of the Glenfinnan Monument (Jacobite era) and the famous Glenfinnan Viaduct (as seen on a Bank Of Scotland £10 note). The viaduct has become known to millions in recent years as the "Harry Potter Bridge" after it featured in the films of the books by J.K. Rowling, specifically Harry Potter and the Chamber of Secrets. Glenfinnan has also been used in Charlotte Gray and Highlander.

=== Climate ===
Fort William has an oceanic climate (Cfb) with moderate, but generally cool, temperatures and abundant precipitation. In the towns immediate vicinity, there are significant variations in elevation, which leads to some uninhabited areas near the town having a subpolar oceanic climate (Cfc), or, at the absolute highest elevations such as Ben Nevis, a tundra climate (ET). Fort William does not have an official Met Office weather station; as such, the values in the table below are simulated, and the record high and low temperatures are not available.

Climate data for Fort William, United Kingdom
Month	Jan	Feb	Mar	Apr	May	Jun	Jul	Aug	Sep	Oct	Nov	Dec	Year
Mean daily maximum °C (°F)	7.1 (44.8)	7.5 (45.5)	9.4 (48.9)	11.1 (52.0)	14.7 (58.5)	16.5 (61.7)	18.5 (65.3)	18.3 (64.9)	16.1 (61.0)	12.8 (55.0)	9.4 (48.9)	7.3 (45.1)	12.4 (54.3)
Daily mean °C (°F)	4.2 (39.6)	4.3 (39.7)	5.8 (42.4)	7.4 (45.3)	10.4 (50.7)	12.6 (54.7)	14.7 (58.5)	14.6 (58.3)	12.5 (54.5)	9.4 (48.9)	6.3 (43.3)	4.2 (39.6)	8.9 (48.0)
Mean daily minimum °C (°F)	1.2 (34.2)	1.1 (34.0)	2.1 (35.8)	3.6 (38.5)	6.0 (42.8)	8.6 (47.5)	10.8 (51.4)	10.8 (51.4)	8.8 (47.8)	6.0 (42.8)	3.1 (37.6)	1.0 (33.8)	5.3 (41.5)
Average precipitation mm (inches)	199 (7.8)	140 (5.5)	149 (5.9)	78 (3.1)	71 (2.8)	71 (2.8)	79 (3.1)	98 (3.9)	129 (5.1)	172 (6.8)	159 (6.3)	159 (6.3)	1,504 (59.2)
Average precipitation days (≥ 1.0 mm)	18	14	17	13	13	12	14	14	15	18	17	16	181
Mean monthly sunshine hours	33	63	90	138	183	157	139	132	101	74	43	28	1,181
Source: scottish-places.info

Climate data for Tulloch Bridge, (Note: Weather station is located 15.0 miles (24.1 km) from the Fort Williams town centre.) elevation 237 m (778 ft), (1991–2020 normals, extremes 1990–present)
Month	Jan	Feb	Mar	Apr	May	Jun	Jul	Aug	Sep	Oct	Nov	Dec	Year
Record high °C (°F)	13.8 (56.8)	14.0 (57.2)	19.9 (67.8)	23.4 (74.1)	26.5 (79.7)	29.9 (85.8)	28.4 (83.1)	29.0 (84.2)	26.4 (79.5)	18.8 (65.8)	16.3 (61.3)	13.9 (57.0)	29.9 (85.8)
Mean daily maximum °C (°F)	5.7 (42.3)	6.0 (42.8)	7.6 (45.7)	10.6 (51.1)	14.0 (57.2)	16.0 (60.8)	17.5 (63.5)	17.0 (62.6)	14.9 (58.8)	11.2 (52.2)	8.0 (46.4)	5.9 (42.6)	11.2 (52.2)
Daily mean °C (°F)	2.8 (37.0)	2.9 (37.2)	4.3 (39.7)	6.5 (43.7)	9.3 (48.7)	11.8 (53.2)	13.5 (56.3)	13.1 (55.6)	11.2 (52.2)	8.0 (46.4)	5.1 (41.2)	2.7 (36.9)	7.6 (45.7)
Mean daily minimum °C (°F)	−0.1 (31.8)	−0.2 (31.6)	0.9 (33.6)	2.4 (36.3)	4.6 (40.3)	7.7 (45.9)	9.5 (49.1)	9.3 (48.7)	7.5 (45.5)	4.8 (40.6)	2.2 (36.0)	−0.5 (31.1)	4.0 (39.2)
Record low °C (°F)	−19.0 (−2.2)	−17.3 (0.9)	−15.0 (5.0)	−9.4 (15.1)	−6.3 (20.7)	−3.3 (26.1)	0.4 (32.7)	−1.8 (28.8)	−4.2 (24.4)	−7.5 (18.5)	−11.7 (10.9)	−20.5 (−4.9)	−20.5 (−4.9)
Average precipitation mm (inches)	250.0 (9.84)	186.6 (7.35)	154.0 (6.06)	103.3 (4.07)	95.3 (3.75)	88.1 (3.47)	94.2 (3.71)	108.3 (4.26)	129.7 (5.11)	191.2 (7.53)	203.4 (8.01)	222.8 (8.77)	1,826.8 (71.92)
Average precipitation days (≥ 1.0 mm)	19.6	17.7	18.0	15.2	14.5	14.6	16.0	16.4	16.4	19.5	19.7	19.1	206.5
Source 1: Met Office
Source 2: Starlings Roost Weather

== Economy ==
The area is a tourism centre for hikers due to its proximity to Ben Nevis, and to drivers wanting to see a nearby railway bridge, the Glenfinnan Viaduct. The Glenfinnan Viaduct was used in the film Harry Potter and the Chamber of Secrets and in three other films in the series, and is often called The Harry Potter Bridge. To address the automotive congestion, travellers by train are given discounts at local venues.

Just outside the town is a large aluminium plant once operated by Alcan and powered by the Lochaber hydroelectric scheme, in its day the biggest tunnelling project in the world. This was formerly served by the Lochaber Narrow Gauge Railway better known locally as the Puggy Line.

In November 2016, Sanjeev Gupta's Liberty Steel Group purchased the Lochaber aluminium plant from Rio Tinto.

On 3 April 2021, it came to light during Gupta's financial troubles involving Greensill Capital that the Jahama Highland Estates (formerly the "Alcan Estate") had been purchased in 2016 as part of the Rio Tinto deal for the Lochaber aluminium plant, because the furnace requires so much power that the smelter is located near a hydroelectric plant, which drains the basin of the 114,000-acre (46,000-hectare) Estate.

The Estate includes the north face of Ben Nevis. According to reports, the Scottish National Party mandated that the Estate never be split from the hydro plant and aluminium smelter, but Gupta ignored them and placed ownership of the Estate in a company that is domiciled on the Isle of Man. The 2016 deal was worth £330 million and was guaranteed by the UK Chancellor of the Exchequer. Conservative finance spokesperson Murdo Fraser was critical of the alleged breach of the SNP agreement and urged the SNP to "take whatever steps are necessary to protect public funds".

== Transport ==
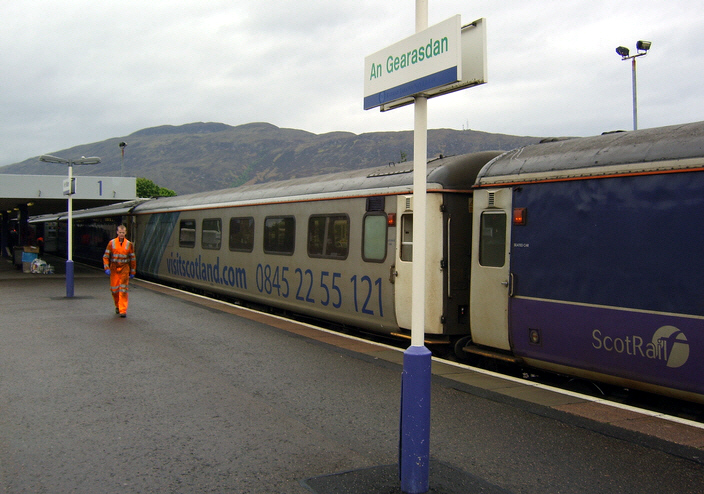
Arrival at Fort William of the overnight sleeper train from London Euston.

Trains: The West Highland Line passes through Fort William. Owing to the difficult terrain in the area, the line from Glasgow to the south enters from the north-east. Trains from Glasgow to Mallaig, the terminus of the line, have to reverse at Fort William railway station. An overnight train between Fort William and London is also ran by the Caledonian Sleeper, this service is known colloquially as "The Deerstalker".

Bus and coach connections: There are Scottish Citylink busses linking Fort William Bus Station with Glasgow, Oban, the Isle of Skye and Inverness as well as various smaller connections to nearby places such as Mallaig and Glen Nevis. The stands for buses and express coaches are on MacFarlane Way adjacent to the railway station.

The Caledonian Canal connects the Scottish east coast at Inverness with the west coast at Corpach, near Fort William.

The Corran Ferry crosses Loch Linnhe, connecting the A82 road to the A861 road.

Fort William is located on the A82. The closest motorway access is the junction after Erskine bridge (just off the A82) of the M898 near Erskine in Renfrewshire, 98 miles to the south west, joining onto the M8 motorway and the south.

== Health ==
The main hospital in Lochaber is Belford Hospital in Fort William.

In 2023 exploratory work began to replace the hospital, with construction expected to begin in the Blar Mhor area near Caol in 2025, with an estimated completion date of 2028. In 2024 funding issues resulted in a potential delay to the construction of the new hospital with protests taking place in Fort William.

== Education ==
Lochaber High School is the local high school and serves a large catchment area which includes the surrounding villages.

West Highland College is part of the University of the Highlands and Islands. It hosts the School of Adventure Studies (SOAS) offering both further education courses and higher education honours degrees.

== Sport ==
=== Mountain biking ===
Just outside the town, parallel to the Nevis Range Gondola, there is a large downhill mountain bike track which attracts thousands of visitors every year, including international competitors and fans.

Each year since 2002, Fort William has hosted a round of UCI Mountain Bike World Cup and, in 2007, it hosted the UCI Mountain Bike & Trials World Championships ('The Worlds'). A trials competition is held at the various courses at the bottom.

Fort William has hosted the World Endurance Mountain Bike Organisation (WEMBO) solo 24-hour championship in 2014 and again in 2018. The event consists of riders racing for a full 24 hours and is won by the rider who has completed the greater number of laps.

=== Motorcycle trials ===
Fort William is the home of the Scottish Six Day Motorcycle Trial (SSDT), which is held annually in the first full week of May. It attracts many competitors from all across the globe and, in 2011, the event celebrated its centenary year.

=== Others ===
Fort William has two major shinty teams: Fort William Shinty Club and Kilmallie Shinty Club. It also has a football team, Fort William F.C., that competes in the Scottish North Caledonian League and plays home games at Claggan Park.

In addition, the town is home to Lochaber Rugby Club and to the Lochaber Yacht Club, a Community Amateur Sports Club that was founded in 1954. The town also has one golf club, called Fort William Golf Club, which has eighteen holes and is open year-round; it also hosts weekly competitions.

== Festivals ==
In a celebration of mountains and the culture that surrounds them, and in recognition of the importance of climbing and walking tourism to the town, the Fort William Mountain Festival is held there each year. For a number of years, this volunteer-led festival has concentrated mostly around film but, starting in the Year of Highland Culture – Highland 2007, its scope was widened, and it dropped the word 'film' from its title.

== Notable people ==
- Danny Alexander (born 1972), the former Chief Secretary to the Treasury and Liberal Democrat MP for Inverness, Nairn, Badenoch and Strathspey. Brought up in Invergarry, a small village near Fort William.
- Colonel Hugh Cochrane (1829–1884), recipient of the Victoria Cross for actions during the Indian Rebellion of 1857
- Barry Hutchison, author
- Charles Kennedy (1959–2015), former leader of the Liberal Democrat party and former Liberal Democrat Member of Parliament (MP) for Ross, Skye and Lochaber. Although born in Inverness, he was brought up and educated in Fort William.
- Allan MacDonald (Scottish Gaelic: Maighstir Alein, An t-Athair Ailean Dòmhnallach) (1859–1905), Roman Catholic priest, folklore collector, pastor in South Uist & Eriskay and poet who helped create modern Scottish Gaelic literature, was born and brought up in Fort William.
- John McGinlay (born 1964), former Scotland international footballer
- Mary Mackellar (Scottish Gaelic: Màiri NicEalair) (1834–1890), poet and literary translator, was born and brought up in Fort William
- Justin Ryan, interior decorator and television presenter, although born in Glasgow, was brought up in Fort William.
- Duncan Shearer (born 1962), former Scotland international footballer
- Colonel John Wood (1818–1878), recipient of the Victoria Cross for actions during the Anglo-Persian War.

== Bibliography ==
- MacCulloch, Donald B. (1971). Romantic Lochaber. Chambers. ISBN 978-0-550-50347-3.
