= Fersit =

Coordinates: 56.86396°N 4.69511°W

Fersit: Scottish Gaelic: Fearsaid Mhòr
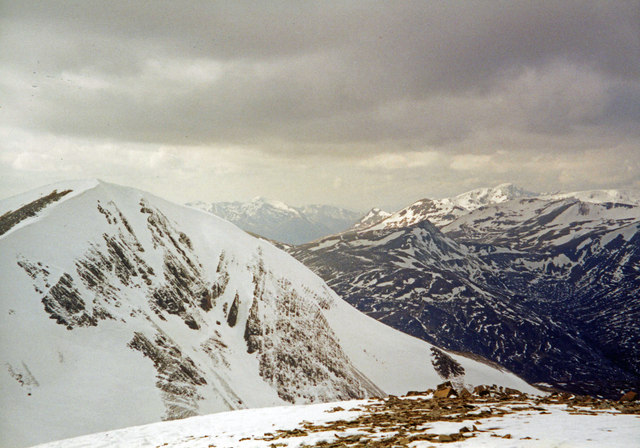
- View from Stob a' Choire Mheadhoin, the large mountain (at 1,105 m) visible from Fersit.

- Location within the Lochaber area
- OS grid reference: NN357779
- Council area: Highland
- Country: Scotland
- Sovereign state: United Kingdom
- Postcode district: PH31 4
- Police: Scotland
- Fire: Scottish
- Ambulance: Scottish

Fersit (Scottish Gaelic: Fearsaid Mhòr) is a hamlet close to Tulloch railway station in Lochaber, Scottish Highlands and is in the Highland council area.

The River Treig, the outlet of Loch Treig, runs past Fersit.

Fersit had a small station on the West Highland Line, known as Fersit Halt. This was a temporary structure, used during the construction of the Lochaber hydro-electric scheme, and closed in 1935. The Lochaber Narrow Gauge Railway, a railway line built for the construction of the hydro scheme, also passed by Fersit.

== Climate ==
Fersit has a local Met Office weather station, Tulloch Bridge. Overall it is generally colder and wetter than the UK average but with cold winters and mild summers.

Climate data for Tulloch Bridge, elevation 237 m (778 ft), (1991–2020 normals, extremes 1990–present)
Month	Jan	Feb	Mar	Apr	May	Jun	Jul	Aug	Sep	Oct	Nov	Dec	Year
Record high °C (°F)	13.8 (56.8)	14.0 (57.2)	19.9 (67.8)	23.4 (74.1)	26.5 (79.7)	29.9 (85.8)	28.4 (83.1)	29.0 (84.2)	26.4 (79.5)	18.8 (65.8)	16.3 (61.3)	13.9 (57.0)	29.9 (85.8)
Mean daily maximum °C (°F)	5.7 (42.3)	6.0 (42.8)	7.6 (45.7)	10.6 (51.1)	14.0 (57.2)	16.0 (60.8)	17.5 (63.5)	17.0 (62.6)	14.9 (58.8)	11.2 (52.2)	8.0 (46.4)	5.9 (42.6)	11.2 (52.2)
Daily mean °C (°F)	2.8 (37.0)	2.9 (37.2)	4.3 (39.7)	6.5 (43.7)	9.3 (48.7)	11.8 (53.2)	13.5 (56.3)	13.1 (55.6)	11.2 (52.2)	8.0 (46.4)	5.1 (41.2)	2.7 (36.9)	7.6 (45.7)
Mean daily minimum °C (°F)	−0.1 (31.8)	−0.2 (31.6)	0.9 (33.6)	2.4 (36.3)	4.6 (40.3)	7.7 (45.9)	9.5 (49.1)	9.3 (48.7)	7.5 (45.5)	4.8 (40.6)	2.2 (36.0)	−0.5 (31.1)	4.0 (39.2)
Record low °C (°F)	−19.0 (−2.2)	−17.3 (0.9)	−15.0 (5.0)	−9.4 (15.1)	−6.3 (20.7)	−3.3 (26.1)	0.4 (32.7)	−1.8 (28.8)	−4.2 (24.4)	−7.5 (18.5)	−11.7 (10.9)	−20.5 (−4.9)	−20.5 (−4.9)
Average precipitation mm (inches)	250.0 (9.84)	186.6 (7.35)	154.0 (6.06)	103.3 (4.07)	95.3 (3.75)	88.1 (3.47)	94.2 (3.71)	108.3 (4.26)	129.7 (5.11)	191.2 (7.53)	203.4 (8.01)	222.8 (8.77)	1,826.8 (71.92)
Average precipitation days (≥ 1.0 mm)	19.6	17.7	18.0	15.2	14.5	14.6	16.0	16.4	16.4	19.5	19.7	19.1	206.5
Source 1: Met Office
Source 2: Starlings Roost Weather
