= Queen Victoria at Loch Laggan =

Painting by Edwin Landseer

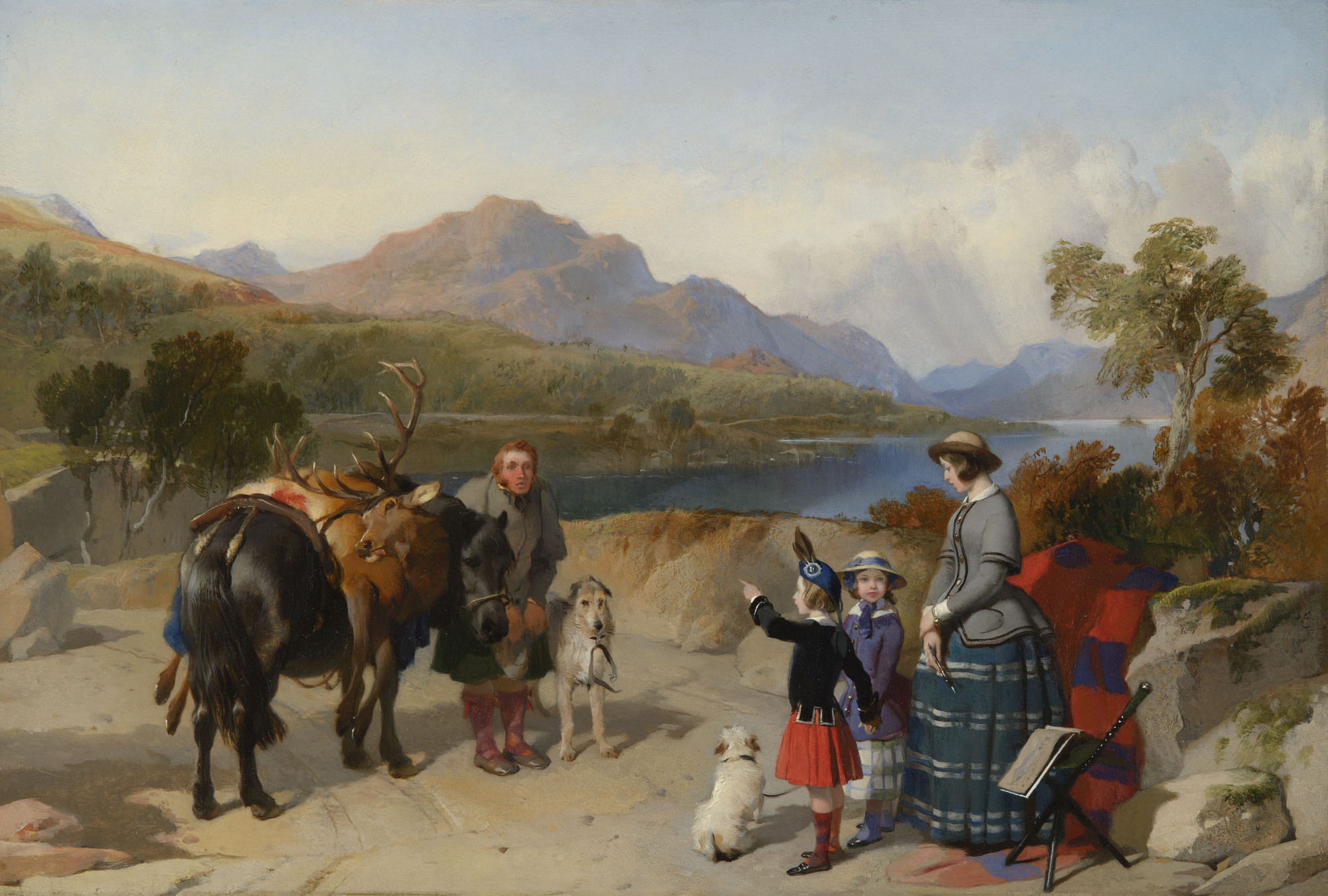
- Artist: Edwin Landseer
- Year: 1847
- Type: Oil on canvas, portrait painting
- Dimensions: 86 cm × 127 cm (33.9 in × 49.9 in)
- Location: Royal Collection

Queen Victoria at Loch Laggan is an 1847 oil painting by the English artist Edwin Landseer. It depicts the reigning British monarch Queen Victoria and her eldest children Victoria, Princess Royal and Edward, Prince of Wales meeting a gillie with a horse carrying a stag shot by the Queen's husband while hunting. The scene takes place by Loch Laggan. The Queen has apparently been sketching the landscape. The work commemorates Victoria and Albert's first visit to the Scottish Highlands when they stayed at Ardverikie House a property lent to them by the Marquess of Abercorn, during the late summer of 1847. It has a double purpose, both offering portrait paintings of the Royal Family and functioning as a genre painting. The implications is that the gillie has not at first recognised who the plainly-dressed queen is.

Landseer was one of the Queen's favourite painters. The work was commissioned by her to provide a memento of the trip. It was completed in time to be given as Christmas gift for Albert and was hung at Windsor Castle. It remains in the Royal Collection today.

== Bibliography ==
- Cosgrove, Denis & Daniels, Stephen. The Iconography of Landscape. Cambridge University Press, 1988.
- Herrmann, Luke. Nineteenth Century British Painting. Charles de la Mare, 2000
- Marsden, Jonathan. Victoria & Albert: Art & Love. Royal Collection, 2010.
- Ormond, Richard. Sir Edwin Landseer. Philadelphia Museum of Art, 1981.
