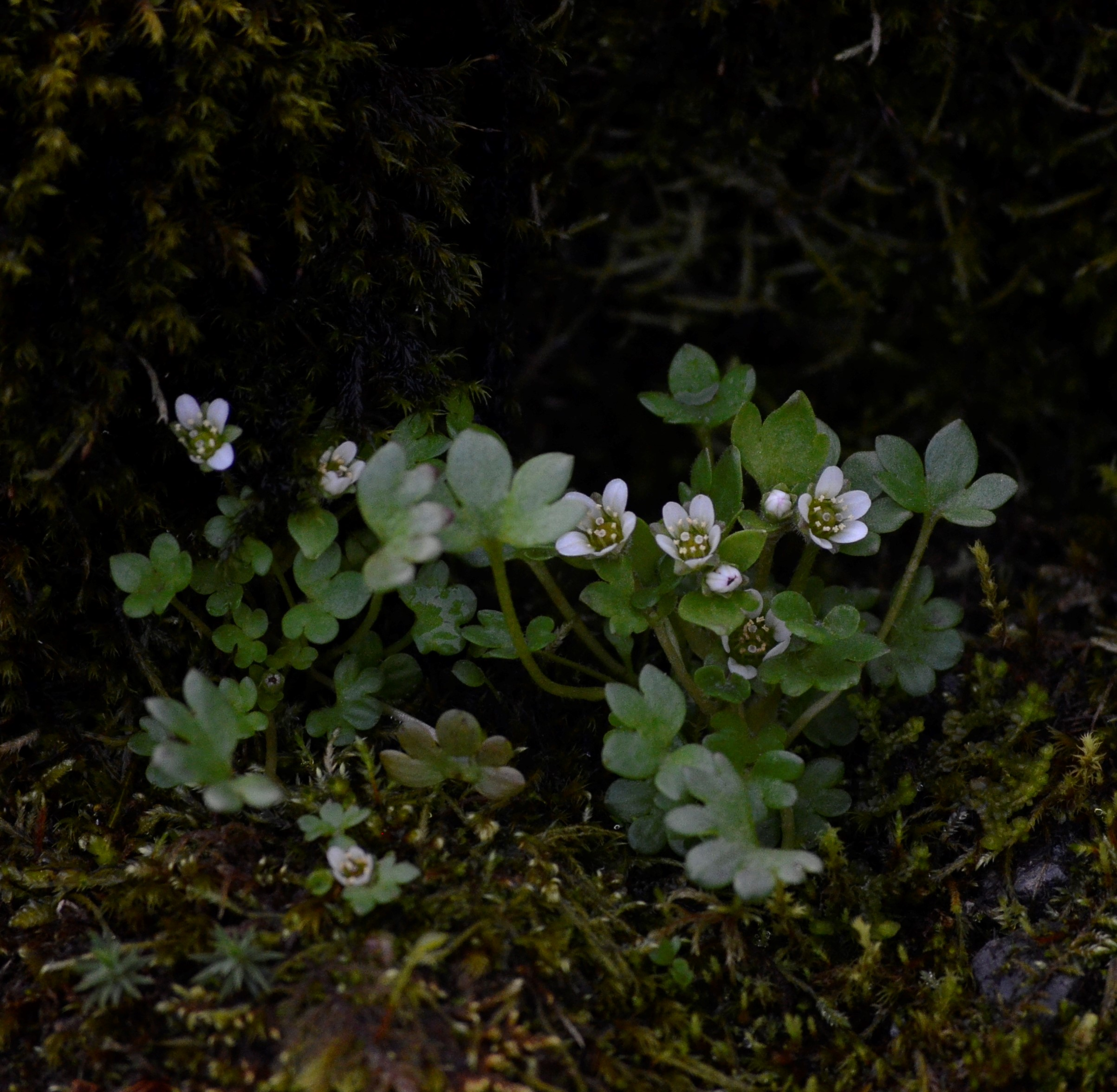

Scientific classification
- Kingdom: Plantae
- Clade: Tracheophytes
- Clade: Angiosperms
- Clade: Eudicots
- Order: Saxifragales
- Family: Saxifragaceae
- Genus: Saxifraga
- Species: S. rivularis

Binomial name
- Saxifraga rivularis L.

Synonyms
- Saxifraga debilis

= Saxifraga rivularis =

Species of flowering plant

Saxifraga rivularis is a species of saxifrage known by several common names, including highland saxifrage, weak saxifrage, alpine brook saxifrage, and pygmy saxifrage.

== Distribution ==
Saxifraga rivularis is native to the northern parts of the Northern Hemisphere, where it has a circumpolar distribution, occurring throughout the Arctic and into the alpine climates of mountainous temperate areas, such as the Sierra Nevada in California. It also occurs in the Highlands of Scotland, from which it takes its name, however it is very rare in this area. It can be found in moist and wet, rocky habitat, in substrates rich in nitrogen and organic material, such as bird rocks and mossy peat flats.

== Description ==
Saxifraga rivularis is a small perennial herb growing not much more than 12 centimeters in maximum height. It has small, lobed leaves at the base and along the stem. Basal leaves are between 5-20mm in length, and petioles are substantially longer than the blade. The inflorescence arises on a hairy, erect peduncle bearing white-petaled flowers and reproductive bulbils.
