= Laggan Dam =

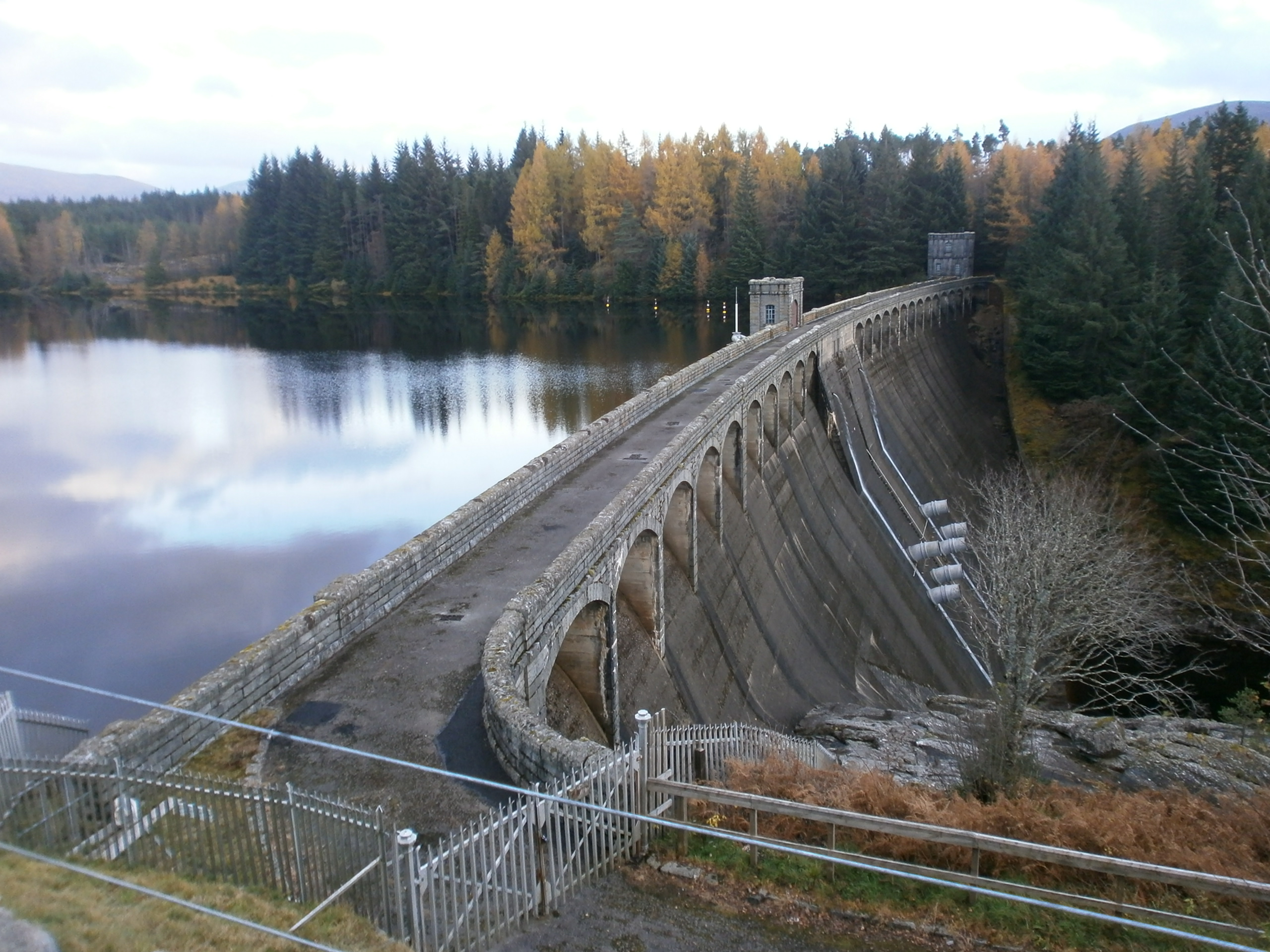
- Laggan Dam
- Interactive map of Laggan Dam
- Official name: Laggan Dam
- Location: Scotland
- Coordinates: 56°53′23″N 4°40′24″W
- Opening date: 1934

Dam and spillways
- Impounds: River Spean
- Height: 48 m (157 ft)
- Length: 700 ft (210 m)

Laggan Dam is a mass concrete gravity dam located on the River Spean south west of Loch Laggan in the Scottish Highlands. It forms the second reservoir for the Lochaber hydroelectric scheme.

== History ==
The structure was built as part of the Lochaber hydroelectric scheme by Balfour Beatty for the British Aluminium Company and construction was finished in 1934. The supervising engineers were the firm of C S Meik and William Halcrow, now known as the Halcrow Group.

The dam was designated a Category B listed building in 1985. It was upgraded to Category A listing in 2011, following a review as part of Hydroelectric Power Thematic Survey 2010.

== Design ==
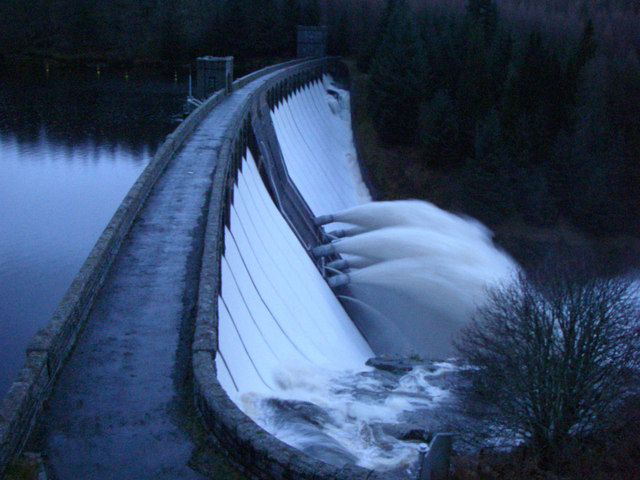
Water flowing over the spillway and the pipes in the centre of the dam

The dam is about 700 feet (210 metres) long, and 48 m (157 ft) high between the level of the foundations and the crest of the spillway. It is curved upstream like an arch dam with a radius of curvature of 2,000 ft (610 m), but works purely on the principle of a gravity dam.

The dam impounds Laggan Reservoir and Loch Laggan, which are connected via a short section of the River Spean. This was dredged and straightened over a length of approximately 1.3 miles (2 km) to the confluence of the Amhainn Ghuilbinn. The reservoir has a capacity of 40,000,000 cubic metres (1.4 billion cubic feet), between a top water level of 820 feet (250 m) OD and maximum drawdown level of 804 feet (245 m) OD, giving an operational range of 16 feet (4.9 m).

The whole crest of the dam, except for a section in the middle that houses equipment, is a spillway broken into 29 bays by piers that support a roadway across the dam. As well as the spillway, there are six self-priming siphons embedded into the centre of the dam, controlled automatically by system of air valves. The siphons are set to operate in pairs, priming at 820.5, 821.0, and 821.25 feet OD (250.1, 250.2, 250.3 m OD), and discharge through 4′2″ (1.3 m) diameter Glenfield-Kennedy jet disperser pipes. Laggan Dam was the first large siphon spillway used in the UK.

The foundations are built on granite, and the dam was built in seven sections, with copper strip and hot poured asphalt water stops in the joints.

Water from the dam is conveyed to Loch Treig through three miles (5 kilometres) of tunnel. From there, the waters travel through a further 15 miles (24 kilometres) of tunnel, 15 feet (4.6 metres) in diameter, before descending the hillside to a power house at Fort William through five steel pipes.

The dam can be found next to the A86 road from Fort William, however there is no public access over it. The catchment area of the dam was increased by an aqueduct which diverts flow from the River Mashie into the River Pattack. This can be seen at the side of the A86 road in Strath Mashie.

Between 1941 and 1943, the catchment was further expanded by constructing another dam across the headwaters of the River Spey, and diverting flow through a tunnel to Loch Laggan. This was constructed by the 1st Tunnelling Company of the Canadian Army.
