= Bog orchid =

Bog orchid is a common name for several orchids and may refer to:

- Habenaria, a widespread genus of orchids
- Hammarbya, a genus of orchids consisting of a single species, Hammarbya paludosa, widespread in the Northern hemisphere
