= British Aluminium =

British aluminium production company

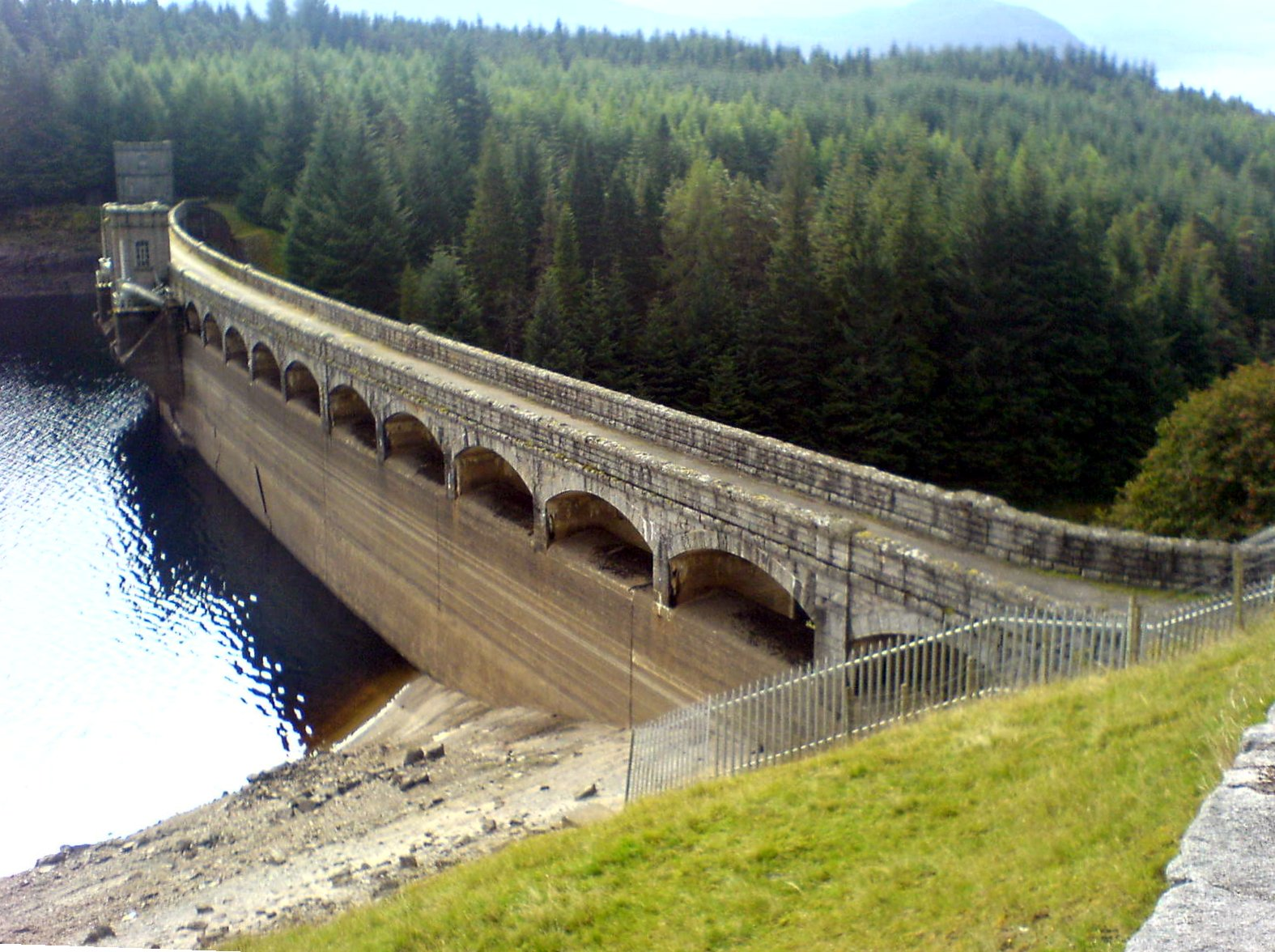
The Laggan Dam was constructed in 1934 to provide hydro-electric power for refining aluminium

British Aluminium was an aluminium production company. It was originally formed as the British Aluminium Company Ltd on 7 May 1894 and was subsequently known as British Alcan Aluminium plc (1982-1996).

== History ==
In the late 1880s and early 1890s, innovations in the extraction of alumina from ore (bauxite) and of converting this into aluminium by electrolysis had precipitated a drastic fall in the price of the metal.

The electrolytic process required large amounts of electricity, which could be easily and cheaply provided by hydro-electric power in the Scottish Highlands. The first aluminium ingots were produced at Foyers in the highlands in 1895 with the first hydro-electric powered smelter opening in 1896 followed by two more, at Kinlochleven in 1909 and Lochaber in 1929. Unsuccessful attempts at bauxite extraction in Northern Ireland forced the company to acquire a controlling interest in Union des Bauxites of Southern France. This established source was supplemented by the acquisition of bauxite rights in British Guiana during World War I followed by more in the Gold Coast (now Ghana), in 1928.

The company produced carbon at three different sites in Scotland and owned four rolling mills in England. In the 1940s and '50s the company opened and/or invested in aluminium plants and infrastructure in Norway, India, Canada, British Guiana and acquired further bauxite resources in Australia.

=== Acquisition, end ===
In 1958, however, finance problems led to the company being taken over by the American Reynolds Metals and TI Group. Despite overcapacity during the 1960s, a large smelter built on the promise of cheap nuclear generated electricity commenced production in Invergordon in 1971; this plant would close eleven years later.

The company was bought again by the Canadian-based Alcan in 1982. Operations were merged and the company was renamed British Alcan Ltd.

In 1994, the company produced 357,000 tonnes of aluminium and made a pre-tax profit of £30.9m up from a loss of £22.7m the previous year.

In February 1996 it was announced that Alcan was to sell British Alcan to a group of institutional investors, Mercury Development Capital, Morgan Grenfell Development Capital and CVC Capital Partners for £300m. The new company would be known as British Aluminium Ltd.

Alcoa acquired the "aluminum plate, sheet and soft-alloy extrusion manufacturing operations and distribution businesses" of British Aluminium in 2000 from Luxfer Group who retained some of the business. Alcoa decided to close the site at Dolgarrog in North Wales in 2002. Dolgarrog Aluminium Ltd formed and the local government tried to finance saving the nearly 200 jobs there. After five years as of October 2007, during the year of the site's 100th anniversary of producing aluminium Dolgarrog was to close.

BACo also produced bus bodies, on Daimler Fleetline and Leyland Fleetline chassis for Kowloon Motor Bus as well as Leyland Atlantean chassis for Singapore Bus Services.

== Chairmen ==
The chairmen of British Aluminium have been:

- 1910-1925 Andrew Wilson Tait
- 1953–1958 Lord Portal
- 1958- Sir Ivan Stedeford
