= Lochaber hydroelectric scheme =

Hydroelectric power station in Highland, Scotland

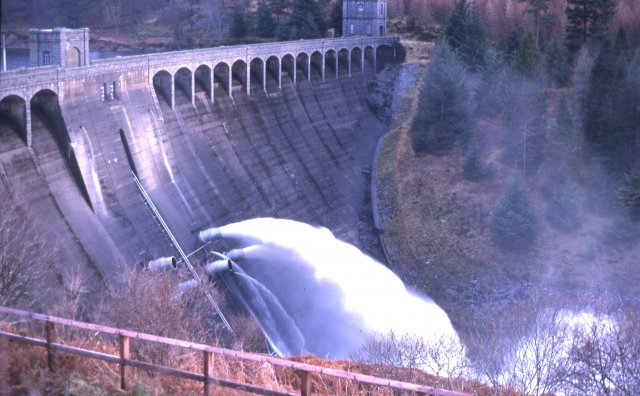
- Country: United Kingdom
- Location: Fort William, Scotland, UK
- Coordinates: 56.8296°N 5.0702°W
- Status: Operational
- Construction began: 1924
- Commission date: 1929 (refurbished 2008-2012)

Power generation
- Units operational: 5 × 17.3 MW
- Make and model: Andritz Hydro Francis turbines
- Nameplate capacity: 88 MW

External links
- Commons: Related media on Commons

The Lochaber hydroelectric scheme is a hydroelectric power generation project constructed in the Lochaber area of the western Scottish Highlands after the First World War. Like its predecessors at Kinlochleven and Foyers, it was designed to provide electricity for aluminium production, this time at Fort William.

Water is collected from the River Spean catchment, plus the headwaters of the River Spey and some smaller watercourses. It contains two main reservoirs Loch Treig and Laggan Reservoir, and 18 miles (29 km) of tunnels excavated through the hillside.

The scheme was originally built between 1924 and 1943 by the British Aluminium Company. This company was bought by Canadian-based Alcan in 1982 which was subsequently bought by Rio Tinto in 2008. Rio Tinto Alcan then sold the scheme to GFG Alliance in November 2016.

The hydroelectric scheme and aluminium smelter are still in operation.

== Scheme Layout ==
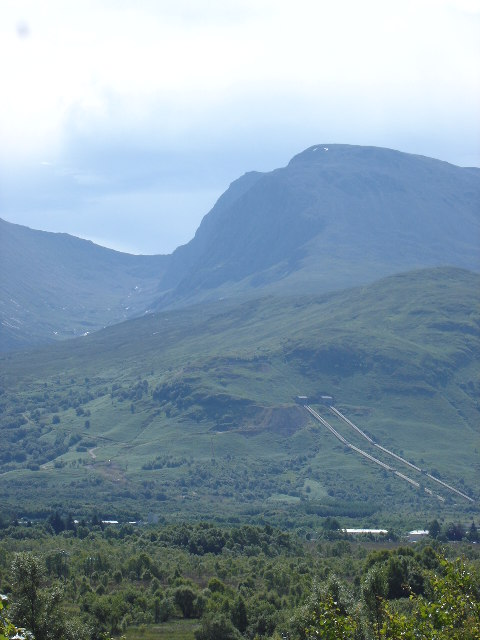
Penstocks carrying water to the aluminium smelter at Fort William; Ben Nevis is in the background

The hydro scheme has a catchment area of 303 square miles (780 km^{2}), including the headwaters of the River Spey, the River Spean and River Treig, and the northern flanks of the Grey Corries and Ben Nevis. There are two principle reservoirs, Loch Treig and Loch Laggan (which was extended as Laggan Reservoir), both with a top water level of about 820 feet (250 m) above sea level. These reservoirs are linked by a 2¾ mile (4.4 km) long, 15 feet (4.6 m) diameter low pressure tunnel, which collects water from three intermediate streams.

From Loch Treig, a main pressure tunnel 15 miles (24 km) long was driven around the Ben Nevis massif. This has a horseshoe shaped cross-section, with an equivalent diameter of 15 feet 2 inches (4.6 m), and lined with concrete to reduce friction. This tunnel also collects water from a further eleven burns along the way. It was, until 1970, the longest water-carrying tunnel in the world. Steel penstocks then convey the water down the western flank of Ben Nevis to the power house below.

Turbines in the power house generate electricity to power the adjacent aluminium smelting plant. The power house and smelter are located to the northeast of Fort William, on the eastern bank of the River Lochy, into which the tailrace discharges.

The scheme was expanded to increase output to meet demand for aluminium in World War II. Floodwaters of the Spey are captured by Spey Dam and diverted via an open cut to Loch Crunachdan then through a tunnel to Loch Laggan. In addition, the River Mashie (a tributary of the Spey) is diverted via an aqueduct and tunnel into the River Pattack, which flows into Loch Laggan.

== Construction ==
The scheme was initially designed by engineer Charles Meik but after his death in 1923, the scheme's realisation was left to William Halcrow, by then a partner in the firm founded by Meik's father Thomas Meik.

The project was finally sanctioned by Parliament in 1921, but construction did not start until 1924. Given the scale of construction, it was undertaken in three main phases:

1. The works to the west of Loch Treig, including the pressure tunnel, intake, powerhouse, and smelter.
2. The Treig and Laggan dams, plus connecting tunnel and intakes.
3. The Spey dam, Crunachdan cut and tunnel, plus the River Mashie diversion and Strathmashie tunnel.

Over 3,000 men were employed during the peak of construction.

A narrow-gauge railway was used in construction and subsequent maintenance of phases 1 and 2, see Lochaber Narrow Gauge Railway for details.

=== Stage 1 – downstream of Loch Treig ===
The first stage of construction took five years, from 1924 to 1930, and cost around £3m.

The main challenge was the pressure tunnel from Loch Treig under the Ben Nevis massif, which commenced in summer 1926. The tunnel was dug by hand through the solid rock, with compressed air drills used to bore holes for the explosive charges. Initially liquid oxygen based explosives were used, but despite being safer their use was complicated, so gelignite was used instead. The final stage of construction, was to connect the tunnel to Loch Treig, having dug to a point about 20 feet (6 m) from the bottom of the loch and 100 feet (30 m) below the surface. On 3 January 1930, a charge of 1.5 tons of specially prepared gelignite was detonated to blast out the remaining section of rock.

To facilitate construction, work progressed in both directions from 11 intermediate points: four vertical shafts and seven horizontal adits, giving a total of 23 working faces including the western portal above Fort William. These intermediate points were located close to watercourses, which were later captured by a series of dams and contributed around 16% of the total water for the scheme.

The power station and smelter were completed by the end of 1929, initially equipped with five 6,800 kW generators, connected to Pelton turbines. The turbines sat in a deep rock excavation, as close to sea level as possible to maximise the head of the scheme.

On 30 December 1929, the first aluminium was cast, powered only by the waters from the side streams.

=== Stage 2 – Treig and Laggan Dams ===
A Supplementary Act of Parliament was obtained in July 1930 extending the time to complete the second stage of the scheme. Work started early the following year and the civil engineering works on the Treig and Laggan dams plus connecting tunnel were completed by 1934.

Three years later, following a period of slack demand for aluminium, the power station was upgraded. Three additional pipes were installed on the hillside above the power station. These were 69 inches (1.8 m) in diameter, delivered in 30 feet (9.1 m) long sections, and welded together in-situ. Five additional Pelton turbines and generators were installed, each rated at 7,000 kW.

==== Treig Dam ====
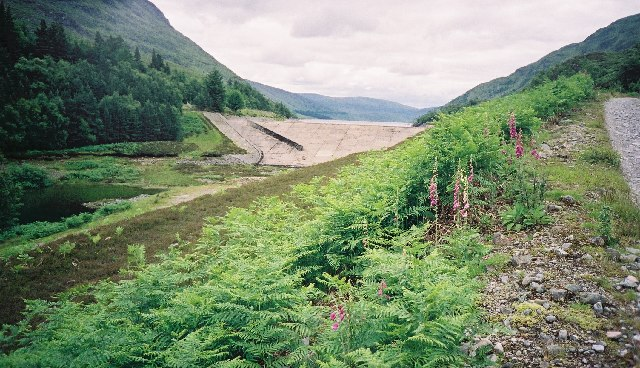
Loch Treig dam from downstream

A dam was built approximately 1/4 mile (400 m) downstream of Loch Treig, raising the top water level by 35 feet (11 m) to 819 feet (250 m) OD. This significantly increased the storage available, with 7,838 million cubic feet (221.9 million m^{3}) available above the lowest draw-down level of 695 feet (212 m) OD. The dam also increased the head of the hydro scheme, providing more power.

The dam is rock-filled with a central concrete core-wall keyed into the bedrock. The exposed part of the dam is 40 feet (12 m) high and 380 feet (120 m) wide, while the core wall has a crest length of 675 feet (206 m) and maximum depth of 122 feet (37 m). Both upstream and downstream faces have a slope of 3:1, with the spillway protected by reinforced concrete, cast in-situ.

Construction of the reservoir also necessitated diverting 1.5 miles (2.4 km) of the West Highland Line along the shores of Loch Treig.

==== Laggan Dam ====
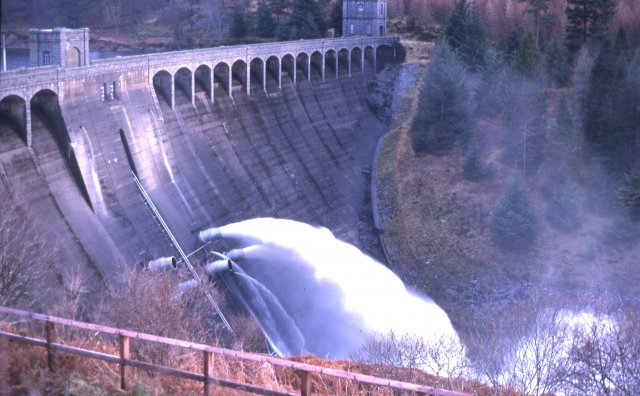
Laggan Dam with 2 of 6 siphons discharging water downstream

Laggan Dam was constructed at a constriction in the valley approximately 4.5 miles (7 km) downstream of Loch Laggan creating Laggan Reservoir. This is linked to Loch Laggan by a short section of the River Spean, which was dredged to make use of the storage capacity in the loch. While the downstream dam site required a larger dam than an alternative location upstream it had several advantages:

- A shorter tunnel to Loch Treig, with a smaller diameter for an equivalent capacity,
- Increased storage capacity in Laggan Reservoir, including dead storage below the tunnel invert level for the accumulation of sediment, and
- Removing the need for an aqueduct to divert the Roughburn.

The dam is a massive concrete gravity structure, 700 feet (210 m) long and 130 feet (40 m) high. In plan, the dam has a slight curve with a radius of 2,000 feet (610 m), although it does not function as an arched dam. The dam has a plain spillway along its length, together with six siphons to increase the flood flow capacity.

Laggan Reservoir has a usable storage of 1,480 million cubic feet (42 million m^{3}), between a top water level of 820 feet (250 m) OD and maximum drawdown level of 804 feet (245 m). The level of Loch Laggan was not raised by the dam, as this would have required significant diversion of the adjacent A86 road and would have also inundated valuable property.

==== Connecting tunnel ====
As with the main pressure tunnel downstream of Loch Treig, the tunnel between Laggan Reservoir was driven through rock and lined with concrete. Again, it was constructed from multiple faces with three intermediate adits, which were then used to collect water from streams. The tunnel is approximately 14 feet (4.3 m) in diameter with a flattened invert, and has a fall of 15 feet (4.6 m) over the 2.75 miles (4.4 km) length.

=== Stage 3 – Spey Dam and Mashie diversion ===
The third and final phase of the scheme was undertaken between 1941 and 1943, and further enlarged the catchment of Loch Laggan by harnessing the headwaters of the River Spey. The work was supervised by Syril Minchin Roberts, a partner in Sir William Halcrow and Partners. It was constructed by Balfour Beatty, with assistance from the 1st Tunnelling Company of the Canadian Army. Many of these Canadian soldiers were ex-miners from Kirkland Lake.

The Spey Dam was constructed in 1942–1943, just downstream of the confluence of the River Markie. The main structure is a concrete gravity dam, 943 feet (287 m) long and 57 feet (17 m) high. It has a spillway 93 metres (305 ft) long at a crest level of 268.2 metres (880 ft) OD, and a mass fill section to the north, approximately 2 metres (6.6 ft) higher. The dam incorporates a fish pass at the southern side.

Water impounded by the dam flows westwards through a cut into Loch Crunachdan, against the natural flow of water. It then passes through a tunnel approximately 2 miles (3 km) long which discharges into the eastern end of Loch Laggan. The maximum abstraction from the Spey is 776 cubic feet per second (22.0 m^{3}/s), although the average for 2020–2022 was just 14 m^{3}/s. The tunnel was constructed in 1941, completed at the end of December.

A smaller dam was constructed across the River Mashie, a tributary of the Spey, just upstream of the A86 road. Water is transferred via an aqueduct and two smaller tunnels to the River Pattack, the main inflow to Loch Laggan. The maximum abstraction is 11.3 m^{3}/s (400 cu ft/s).

=== Turbine upgrade ===
In 2008, Rio Tinto Alcan awarded a contract worth €30m for the upgrade of the hydroelectric turbines to Andritz Tech Hydro. This was to replace the original twelve turbines, which were horizontal-axis twin-jet Pelton wheel machines driving two DC generators with a total capacity of 72 MW. Five new horizontal-axis Francis turbines driving AC generators were installed by 2012, each rated at 17.3 MW giving a 20% increase in power output.

== Present operation ==
=== Fort William Smelter ===
Following the closure of Rio Tinto/Alcan's other UK smelters at Invergordon (1981), Kinlochleven (2000), Anglesey (2009) and Lynemouth (2012) the hydro-electric scheme and smelter at Fort William was operated by Rio Tinto Alcan. Under threat of closure the smelter was put up for sale in 2016. GFG Alliance, which incorporates SIMEC and the Liberty House Group, as the successful bidder, bought the Lochaber Smelter for £330 million. It announced plans to expand the factory and produce car parts such as alloy wheels. This was later dropped, replaced by plans for an aluminium recycling facility announced in November 2020.

=== The Alcan Estate ===
On 3 April 2021, it came to light that the Jahama Highland Estates (formerly the "Alcan Estate") had been purchased in 2016 as part of the Rio Tinto Mines deal for the Lochaber aluminium plant, because the furnace requires so much power that the smelter is located near a hydroelectric plant, which drains the basin of the 114,000 acre Estate. Alcan designed all their smelters that way. The Estate includes the north face of Ben Nevis. According to reports, the Scottish Government mandated that the Estate never be split from the hydro plant and aluminium smelter, but Gupta ignored them and placed ownership of the Estate in a company that is domiciled on the Isle of Man. The 2016 deal was worth £330 million and was guaranteed by the UK Chancellor of the Exchequer. Conservative finance spokesperson Murdo Fraser was critical about the alleged breach of the Scottish Government agreement and urged the Scottish Government to "take whatever steps are necessary to protect public funds".

== See also ==
- Lochaber Narrow Gauge Railway for the construction and maintenance of the water-carrying tunnel

== Bibliography ==
- Payne, Peter L. (1988). The Hydro: A study of the development of the major hydro-electric schemes undertaken by the North of Scotland Hydro-Electric Board. Aberdeen: Aberdeen Univ. Pr. pp. 8–15. ISBN 978-0-08-036584-8.
- Miller, James (2007). The Dam Builders: Power from the Glens. Edinburgh: Birlinn Limited. ISBN 978-1-84158-225-2.
- Wood, Emma (2002). The Hydro Boys. Edinburgh: Luath Press. ISBN 978-1-84282-047-6.
