= Loch Treig =

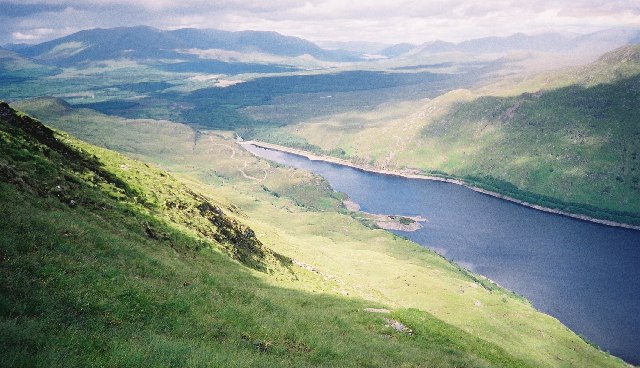
- with Glen Spean

- Location within Highland
- Location: NN3473
- Coordinates: 56.81399°N 4.72704°W
- Type: freshwater loch, natural, reservoir
- Basin countries: United Kingdom
- Max. length: 8.43 km (5.24 mi)
- Max. width: 0.63 km (0.39 mi)
- Surface area: 743 ha (1,840 acres)
- Average depth: 63.2 m (207 ft)
- Max. depth: 132.9 m (436 ft)
- Water volume: 463,782,740.00 m^{3} (16,378,332,894.3 ft^{3})
- Shore length^{1}: 22 km (14 mi)
- Surface elevation: 251 m (823 ft)
- Max. temperature: 10.2 °C (50.4 °F)
- Min. temperature: 10.2 °C (50.4 °F)
- ^{1} Shore length is not a well-defined measure.

Loch Treig is a deep freshwater loch situated in a steep-sided glen 20 km (12 mi) east of Fort William, in Lochaber, Highland, Scotland. While there are no roads alongside the loch, the West Highland Line follows its eastern bank.

Loch Treig was originally a natural freshwater loch over 400 feet (120 m) deep. In 1929, Loch Treig was made into a reservoir, retained behind the Treig Dam, forming part of the Lochaber hydro-electric scheme, which required diversion of the West Highland Railway. The increase in water level following the construction of the dam submerged the hamlets of Kinlochtreig and Creaguaineach at the loch's southern end, which were stopping points on a cattle drovers' road along the Road to the Isles, which linked up Lochaber and the Inner Hebrides to markets in Perthshire in the south.

Ken Smith (b. 1947), a self-described hermit, has lived alone in a rough cabin on the shore of Loch Treig for forty years. He was profiled in the documentary The Hermit of Treig (2022), and wrote the memoir The Way of the Hermit (2023). Laura Miller opined in 2024, he "may be the most famous living hermit in Scotland".

== See also ==
- List of reservoirs and dams in the United Kingdom
