= Loch Laggan =

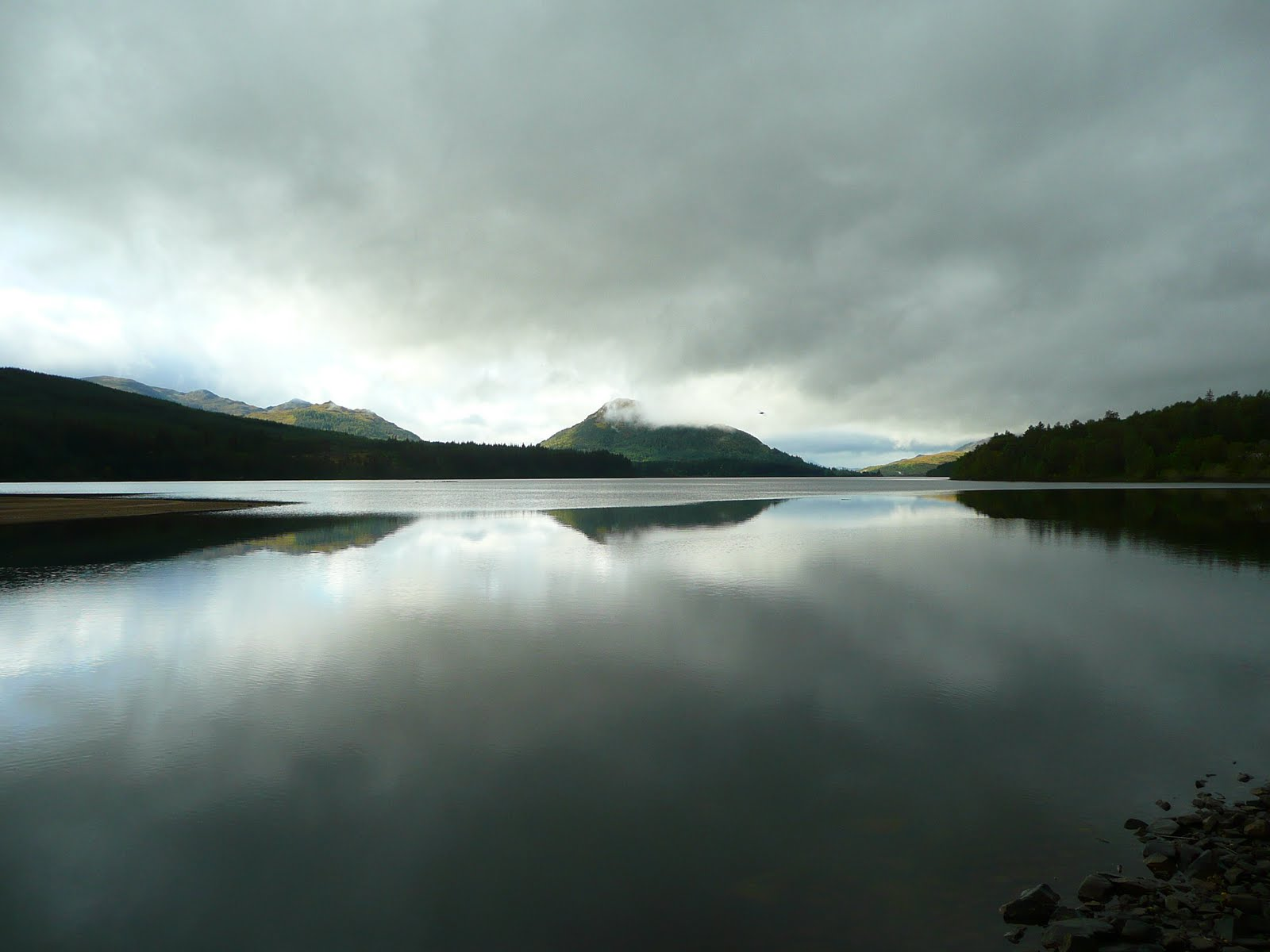

- Location within Highland
- Location: Inverness-shire, Highland, Scotland
- Coordinates: 56.9481°N 4.4901°W
- Type: freshwater loch
- Primary inflows: River Pattack
- Primary outflows: River Spean
- Basin countries: Scotland
- Max. length: 7 mi (11 km)
- Max. width: 0.66 mi (1.06 km)
- Surface area: 216.5 ha (535 acres)
- Average depth: 68 ft (21 m)
- Max. depth: 174 ft (53 m)
- Water volume: 5,600,000,000 ft^{3} (160,000,000 m^{3})
- Surface elevation: 248 m (814 ft)
- Islands: 9

Loch Laggan is a freshwater loch situated approximately 6 1/2 mi (10.5 km) west of Dalwhinnie in the Scottish Highlands. The loch has an irregular shape, runs nearly northeast to southwest and is approximately 7 mi (11 km) in length. It has an average depth of 68 ft (21 m) and is 174 ft (53 m) at its deepest. The eastern end of the loch features the largest freshwater beach in Britain. Since 1934 Loch Laggan has been part of the Lochaber hydro-electric scheme. At the northeast end of the loch is the hamlet of Kinloch Laggan.

The loch was surveyed on 2 and 3 of June 1902 by Sir John Murray, T.R.N. Johnston, James Parsons and James Murray and was later charted as part of the Bathymetrical Survey of Fresh-Water Lochs of Scotland 1897-1909.

The A86 road from Spean Bridge to Kingussie follows the loch's north shore. The River Pattack flows into the head of the loch just below the road bridge at Kinloch Laggan. The boundary of the Cairngorms National Park wraps around the head of the loch. A short section of the River Spean connects the natural loch with the reservoir downstream and this river continues westwards below Laggan Dam. Two other substantial watercourses empty into the loch, the Allt Labhrach which drains Lochan na h-Earba which lies southeast of Loch Laggan and Allt Coire Ardair which rises beneath Creag Meagaidh. The remains of an island dwelling lie in the middle of the loch near Ardverikie.

The loch featured in the popular BBC series Monarch of the Glen as Loch Bogle.

== Popular culture ==
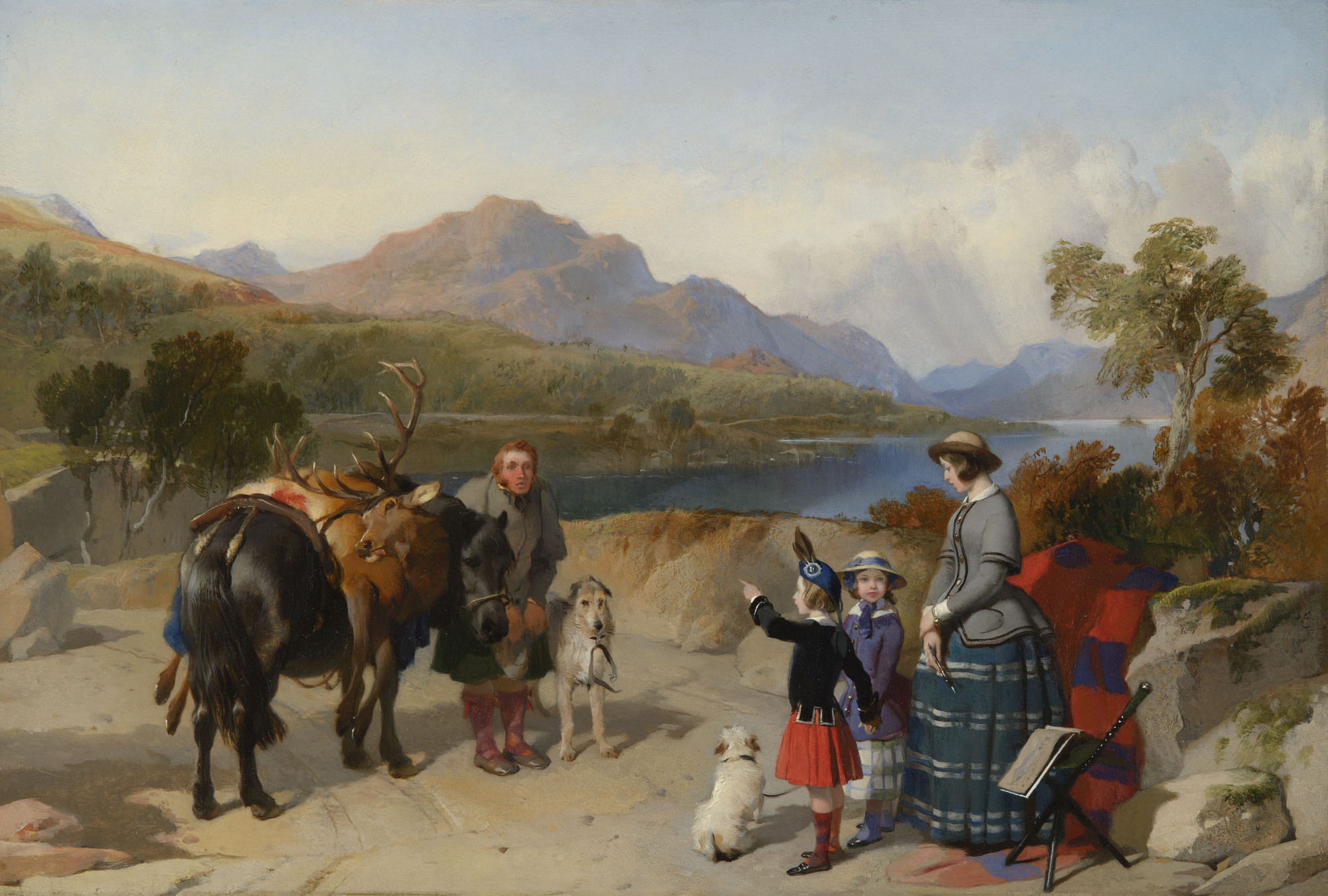
Queen Victoria at Loch Laggan by Edwin Landseer, 1847

Loch Laggan (mostly its castle) is featured in the Temeraire series of novels, being used as a base to raise dragons, because of geothermal heat sources.

Some scenes for Monarch of the Glen were filmed on the shores of the loch.

During summer 2019, filming for No Time to Die was taking place in and near the Cairngorms National Park. Some scenes were also being shot at the Ardverikie House Estate and on the banks of Loch Laggan.

The Loch lends its name to The Laggan, a Scottish folk band, active in the 1960s and 70s who released a series of records and performed internationally.

== Gallery ==
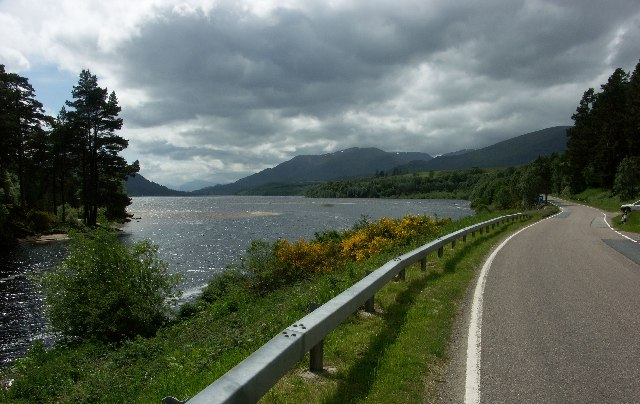

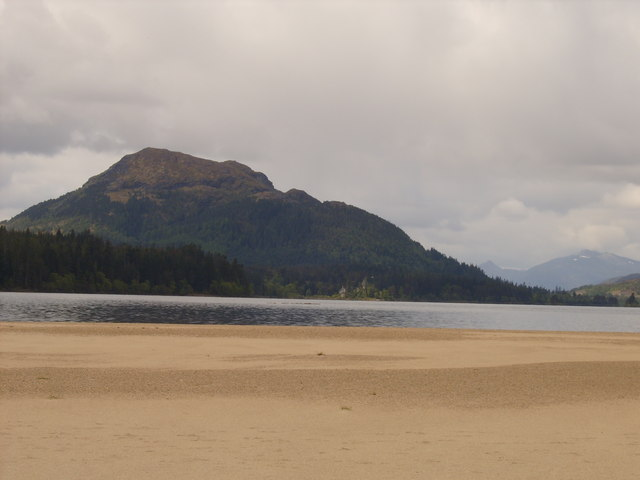

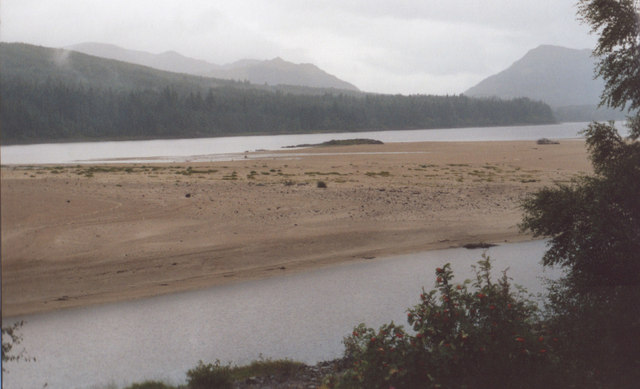

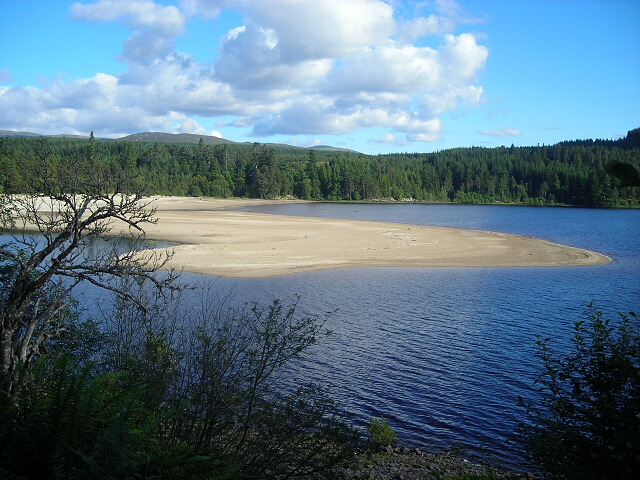

== See also ==
- List of reservoirs and dams in the United Kingdom
