= River Spean =

River in the West Highlands of Scotland

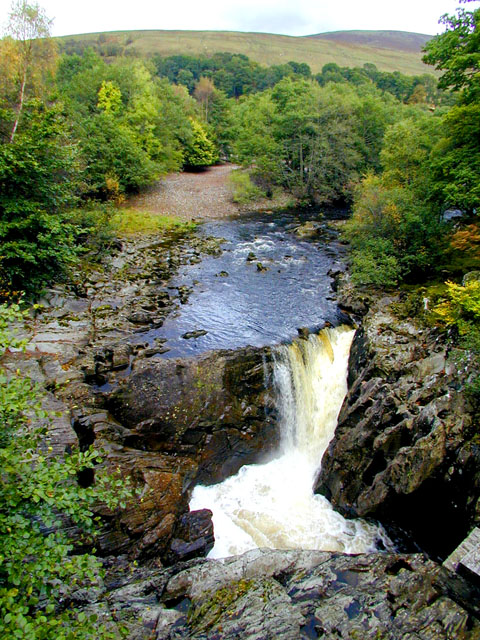
- Waterfall on the Spean near Achluachrach

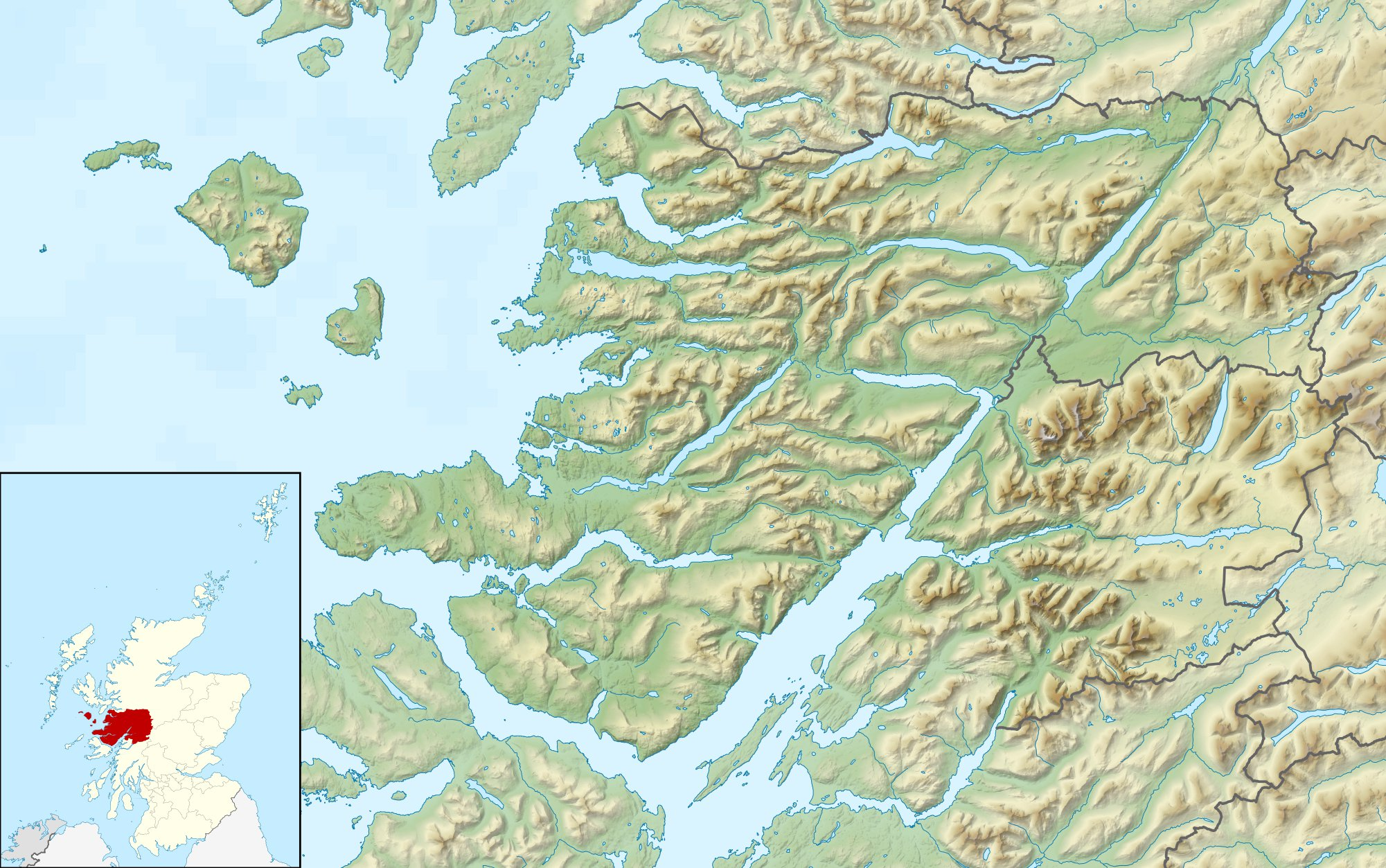
- Location of the mouth within Lochaber

Location
- Country: Scotland

Physical characteristics
- Source
  - location: Loch Laggan
- Mouth
  - location: River Lochy
  - coordinates: 56.90956°N 4.98479°W

The River Spean flows from Loch Laggan in a westerly direction to join the River Lochy at Gairlochy in the Great Glen in the West Highlands of Scotland. Major tributaries of the Spean include the left-bank Abhainn Ghuilbinn and River Treig, the right-bank River Roy and the left-bank river known as The Cour. The river is accompanied by the A86 road for almost its entire length, running from (upper) Loch Laggan west to Spean Bridge. The river is spanned by a bridge carrying the A82 road near its junction with the A86 at Spean Bridge. A minor road bridges the Spean just above the falls at Inverlair. Two further road crossings exist - a private estate road across the short stretch of river between upper Loch Laggan and the Laggan reservoir and a road traversing the top of Laggan Dam. The West Highland Line crosses the river near Tulloch Station and follows its north bank before re-crossing one mile (1.5 kilometres) east of Spean Bridge. A branch of the railway formerly continued west beside the river from Spean Bridge, crossing it once again to the west of the village.

At the end of the last ice age, Glen Spean and Glen Roy contained lakes dammed by ice with a surface elevation of 260 metres (850 ft) at one point. The ice dam collapsed catastrophically around 11,500 years ago and five cubic kilometres of floodwater appear to have drained along the line of the Spean gorge occupied by the modern river.

== See also ==
- List of rivers of Scotland
