= Aonach Beag (Ben Alder) =

Mountain in the Highlands of Scotland

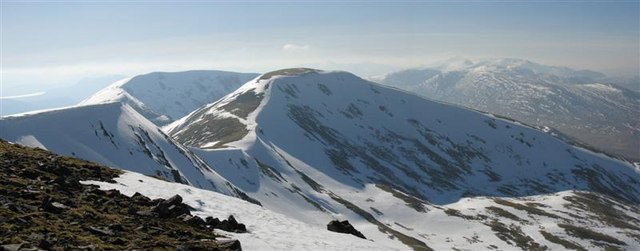
- Aonach Beag (centre) with Beinn Eibhinn to the left and Ben Nevis in the far distance on the right

Highest point
- Elevation: 1,116 m (3,661 ft)
- Prominence: 99 m (325 ft)
- Parent peak: Geal-Charn
- Listing: Munro, Murdo
- Coordinates: 56°50′00″N 4°31′44″W

Naming
- English translation: Little ridge
- Language of name: Gaelic
- Pronunciation: Scottish Gaelic: [ˈɯːnəx ˈpek] English approximation: OON-əkh-BEK

Geography
- Location within Highland
- Location: Ben Alder, Scotland
- Parent range: Grampian Mountains
- OS grid: NN458742
- Topo map: OS Landranger 42

Aonach Beag is a 1,116-metre (3,661 ft) mountain in the Highlands of Scotland in the remote area between Loch Ericht and Loch Laggan located about 4 kilometres (2.5 mi) northwest of Ben Alder. Its prominence is 99 metres (325 ft) with its parent peak, Geal-Charn, about 1 kilometre (0.62 mi) to the east. In Gaelic, Aonach Beag means "little ridge" despite it being a Munro. It should not be confused with the better-known Munro near Ben Nevis, also called Aonach Beag, about 30 kilometres (19 mi) to the west.

The mountain is one of a range of hills running between Loch Ossian and Loch Pattack and is itself at the convergence of three ridges. Its neighbouring peak to the west is Beinn Eibhinn which extends over a larger area although at 1,100 metres (3,600 ft) it is slightly less high. Between these two peaks is Lochan a'Chàrra Mhòir at the head of Choire a'Chàrra Mhòir. The shortest route of ascent starts from Corrour railway station and passes Loch Ossian youth hostal before going beside the southern shore of Loch Ossian to pass Corrour Lodge and then go up Bealach Dubh along Uisge Labhair. At one time the peak was often climbed after staying at Culra bothy but the bothy has since been closed. All routes involve a considerable walk-in.

The mountain lies within the Ben Alder and Aonach Beag Special Area of Conservation as an upland area of acidic scree with Alpine and subalpine calcareous grasslands. The area is very varied ecologically – the three-leaved rush, hare's-foot sedge and scorched alpine sedge are to be found near the summit. On account of the lengthy snow cover the area is exceptional for its bryophytes.

== See also ==
- Ben Nevis
- List of Munro mountains
- Mountains and hills of Scotland
