= Film finance =

Ascertainment of the value of a proposed film

Film finance is an aspect of film production that occurs during the development stage prior to pre-production, and is concerned with determining the potential value of a proposed film.

In the United States, the value is typically based on a forecast of revenues (generally 10 years for films and 20 years for television shows), beginning with theatrical release, and including DVD sales, and release to cable broadcast television networks both domestic and international and inflight airline licensing.

== Overview ==
Film finance is a subset of project finance, meaning the film project's generated cash flows rather than external sources are used to repay investors. The main factors determining the commercial success of a film include public taste, artistic merit, competition from other films released at the same time, the quality of the script, the quality of the cast, the quality of the director and other parties, etc. Even if a film looks like it will be a commercial success "on paper", there is still no accurate method of determining the levels of revenue the film will generate. In the past, risk mitigation was based on pre-sales, box office projections and ownership of negative rights. Along with strong ancillary markets in DVD, cable television, and other electronic media such as SVOD, or streaming video on demand), investors were shown that picture subsidies (tax incentives and credits), and pre-sales (discountable-contract finance) from foreign distributors, could help to mitigate potential losses. As production costs have risen, however, potential financiers have become increasingly insistent upon higher degrees of certainty as to whether they will actually have their investment repaid, and assurances regarding what return they will earn.

Past film slate's poor performance records are showing up in public court documents. Property and casualty companies (P&C) like AIG had offered insurance against film slates and the bonds issued to fund them, but now fully refuse to cover film slates. This ended in many lawsuits, starting in early 1999 (with Steve Stabler's Destination Films $100 million bond fund failure and subsequent lawsuit), and continue to this day with Aramid's lawsuit on Relativity's Beverly-1-Sony film slate and the Melrose-2-Paramount slate. Citigroup attempted to wrap the Beverly-1-Sony slate with a property and casualty insurance wrapper (from the formerly bankrupt Ambac Assurance, Corp.). After these "uninsured" slate financing arrangements (SFA) failed to return even the original principal to investors, the market has sought solutions. Traditionally, banks like JP Morgan have an entertainment division that uses proprietary risk mitigation regression analysis to see if future film revenues can meet an exceedance probability (where in the ultimate revenues allow the loan to break even), but this is calculated guesswork, and has caused all of the major national banks to lose millions in bad loans. An alternative to such loss protection was developed by Geneva Media Holdings, LLC (originally as risk mitigation for affluent individuals and "direct investors" under U.S. tax incentive IRC 181). Fully insured media funds are now being carefully reviewed by risk analysts at major hedge funds, banks and institutional pension plans specializing in investor risk mitigation.

VaultML has developed specific technologies usually seen in the financial sector to predict box office success and investor risk using artificial intelligence. They claim to analyze over 300,000 elements from screenplay to form a basis for prediction. Based on their published future predictions for 2015 they out yielded the market on a return on investment basis.

Ryan Kavanaugh of Relativity Media offered participation in profits to actors, rather than up-front fees, to lower production costs and keep profits protected. Kavanaugh has attempted to use data from major studios like Sony and NBC/Universal to build a complex Monte Carlo system to determine movie failure rates prior to production. His projects and business models have failed miserably, resulting in $500 million in losses. The box office results of his movies have been mixed, as there is no set ratios, blends, mixtures, method or secret crystal ball that can project movie revenues, investor risk, or rejection parameters.

Slated is the first dedicated online film finance marketplace for professional equity investing.

Epagogix has developed a system using neural networks to assess factors that contribute to box office success. They assess a wide variety of movies of different box office returns. Another film finance analyst, Steve Jasmine, claims to have developed a system for predicting a film's box office success. This system claims to quantify 800 creative elements of billion dollar grossing movies to determine what audiences are most interested in. Worldwide Motion Picture Group offers a service termed "script evaluation" where a team of analysts compare draft scripts to those of previously released movies in an effort to estimate the box office potential of the proposed script. They also conduct surveys and use results of previous focus groups to assist this analysis.

Since the collateral for film financing can be based on intellectual property rights, film finance transactions generally commence with a title analysis.

== Public sources ==
=== Government grants ===
A number of governments run programs to subsidise the cost of producing films. For instance, until it was abolished in March 2011, in the United Kingdom the UK Film Council provided National Lottery funding to producers, as long as certain conditions were met. Many of the Council's functions have now been taken over by the British Film Institute. States such as Georgia, Ohio, Louisiana, New York, Connecticut, Oklahoma, Pennsylvania, Utah, and New Mexico, will provide a subsidy or tax credit provided all or part of a film is filmed in that state.

Governments are willing to provide these subsidies as they hope it will attract creative individuals to their territory and stimulate employment. Also, a film shot in a particular location can have the benefit of advertising that location to an international audience, stimulating tourism.

Government subsidies are often pure grants, where the government expects no financial return, although one notable exception is Canadian federal government film agency Telefilm Canada which provides financing in the form of recoupable equity.

=== Tax incentives ===
Some U.S. states and Canadian provinces have between 15% and 70% tax or cash incentives for labor, production costs or services on bona fide film/television/PC game expenditures. Each state and province differs. These so-called "soft-money" incentives are generally not realized until a theatrical or interactive production is completed, all payments are made to workers, financial institutions, and rental or prop companies within the state or province offering the incentives. Many other limitations may apply (i.e., actors, cast and crew may have to take up residence in the state or province). Often, a certain amount of physical shooting (principal photography) must be completed within the state borders, and/or the use of the state's institutions. This would include rental facilities, banks, insurance companies, sound stages or studios, agents, agencies, brokers, catering companies, hotel/motels, etc. Each may also have to be physically domiciled within the state or province's borders. Finally, additional incentives (another 5% to 25% on top of the already generous soft money), may be offered for off-season, low-income area, or family entertainment projects shot in places of economic impoverishment or during poor weather condition months in a hurricane-prone state or Arctic province.

A number of countries have introduced legislation that has the effect of generating enhanced tax deductions for producers or owners of films. Incentives are created which effectively sell the enhanced tax deductions to wealthy individuals with large tax liabilities (e.g., IRS code sections 181 and 199). The individual will often become the legal owner of the film or certain rights relating to the film. In 2007 the United Kingdom government introduced the Producer's Tax Credit which results in a direct cash subsidy from the treasury to the film producer.

==== German tax shelters ====
A relatively new tactic for raising finance is through German tax shelters. The tax law of Germany allows investors to take an instant tax deduction even on non-German productions and even if the film has not yet gone into production. The film producers can sell the copyright to one of these tax shelters for the cost of the film's budget, then have them lease it back for a price around 90% of the original cost. On a $100 million film, a producer could make $10 million, minus fees to lawyers and middlemen.

This tactic favors big-budget films as the profit on more modestly budgeted films would be consumed by the legal and administrative costs.

Despite its frequent use in the past, the above schemes are all but gone and are being replaced by more traditional production incentives.

The main production incentive is the German Federal Film Fund (DFFF). The DFFF is a grant given by the German Federal Commissioner for Culture and the Media. To receive the grant a producer has to fulfill different requirements including a cultural eligibility test. The film finance calculator on germanfilmfinance.com checks online if the project passes the test as well as it shows the individually calculated estimated grant.

==== British tax shelters ====
In British tax shelters, the same copyright can be sold again to a British company and a further $10 million could be raised, but UK law insists that part of the film is shot in Britain and that the production employs a fair proportion of British actors and crew. By using British tax shelter methods, many American films like to shoot at Britain's major film studios like Pinewood and Shepperton and why a film such as Basic Instinct 2 relocated its action from New York to London. These are commonly referred to Sale & Leaseback deals; they were discontinued in March 2007, though those initiated prior to Dec. 31, 2006 were grandfathered in.

== Private sources ==
=== Debt financing ===
==== Pre-sales ====
Pre-sales is, based on the script and cast, selling the right to distribute a film in different territories before the film is completed. When the deal is made, the distributor will insist the producers deliver on certain elements of content and cast; if a material alteration is made, financing may collapse. In order to gain the “marquee names” essential for drawing in an international audience, distributors and sale agents will often make casting suggestions. Pre-sales contracts with big-name actors or directors will often (at the insistence of the buyer) have an "essential element" clause that (as per the example above) allows the buyer to get out of the contract if the star or director falls out of the picture and a marquee equivalent cannot be procured.

The reliance on pre-sales explains the film industry's dependence on movie stars, directors and/or certain film genres (such as Horror).

Typically, upon signing a pre-sale contract, the buyer will pay a 20% deposit to the film's collection account (or bank), with the balance (80%) due upon the film's delivery to the foreign sales agent (along with all the necessary deliverable requirements.)

Usually a producer pre-sells foreign territories (in whole or part) and/or North American windows/rights (i.e. theatrical, home video/DVD, pay TV, free TV, etc.) so that the producer can use the value of those contracts as collateral for the production loan that a bank (senior lender) is providing to finance the production.

==== Television pre-sales ====
Although it is more usual for a producer to sell the TV rights of this film after it has been made, it is sometimes possible to sell the rights in advance and use the money to pay for the production. In some cases the television station will be a subsidiary of the movie studio's parent company.

==== Negative pickup deal ====
A negative pickup deal is a contract entered into by an independent producer and a movie studio wherein the studio agrees to purchase the movie from the producer at a given date and for a fixed sum. Until then, the financing is up to the producer, who must pay any additional costs if the film goes over-budget.

Generally, a producer will have a bank/lender lend against the value of the negative pickup contract as a way to shore up their financing package of the film. This is commonly referred to as "factoring paper". Most major North American studio and network contracts (incl. basic cable) are collateralized/factored by the bank at 100% of the contract value, and the lender just takes a basic origination/setup fee.

Splitting the roles of studios and networks necessitated a means for financing television series appropriate to the varied risks and rewards inherent in the separation. A practice known as "deficit financing" consequently developed – an arrangement in which the network pays the studio that make a show a license fee in exchange for the right to air the show, but the studio retains ownership. The license fee does not fully cover the costs of production – hence the "deficit" of deficit financing.

Deficit financing developed after the varied risks and rewards were determined and carried out through film financing. Deficit financing occurs when the license fee for a show doesn't fully cover production fees. A studio has ownership of the production, but as license fees are handed out in exchange to air a show, the phrase deficit financing comes into play as costs were not being met and paid.

From the late 1960s through the mid-1990s special regulations from financial regulation's and syndication's rules created relations between television networks and independent production companies. These rules stated that ownership of the rights to the programs reverted to the producer/production company after a specified number of network runs (syndication). Profits from any other sales, including syndication, generally benefited the production community. Because of this, production companies produced original shows at a loss, hoping that they would eventually be run by syndication and make their money back.

==== Gap/supergap financing ====
In motion pictures, gap/supergap financing is a form of mezzanine debt financing where the producer wishes to complete their film finance package by procuring a loan that is secured against the film's unsold territories and rights. Most gap financiers will only lend against the value of unsold foreign (non-North American) rights, as domestic (North American: USA & Canadian) rights are seen as a "performance" risk, as opposed to more quantifiable risk that is the foreign market. In short, this means that the foreign value of a film can be ascertained by a foreign sales company/agent by evaluating the blended value of the quality of the script, its genre, cast, director, producer, as well as whether it has theatrical distribution in the US from a major film studio; all of this is taken into consideration and applied against the historical and current market tastes, trends, and needs of each foreign territory of country. This is still an unpredictable practice. Domestic distribution is also unpredictable and far from ever a sure thing (e.g. just because a film has a big budget and a commercial genre and cast, it could still be unwatchable and thus never receive a theatrical or television release in the US, thus being relegated to being a big budget, direct-to-video film.) Any certainty in the entertainment business, lending against foreign value estimates is preferable to betting on strictly a domestic success (comedies and urban films being two notable exceptions: they are referred to as "domestic pieces" or "domestic plays".)

True to its mezzanine nature, in the pecking order of recoupment of investment, generally, gap (or supergap) loans are subordinate to (recoup after) the senior/bank production loan, but in turn, the gap/supergap loan will be senior to (recoup before) equity financiers.

A gap loan becomes a supergap loan when it extends beyond 10-15% of the production loan required to shoot the film (or in other words, when the percentage of the gap required to complete the film's financing package becomes greater than a bank is willing to bear, which is traditionally 10-15%, but can sometime be a flat dollar threshold like US$1,000,000.)

Gap/supergap lending is a very risky form of capital investment and accordingly the fees and interest charged reflect that level of risk. But at the same time it is not unlike buying a house: nobody pays 100% of the purchase price with cash; they pay about 20% in cash and borrow the rest. Supergap financing works by the same principle: put down 20-30% cash/equity and borrow the rest.

==== Bridge financing ====
Bridge finance has increased in prevalence in filmmaking in recent years. Bridge financing is an answer to the common "catch-22" problem of needing funding to get the actors, but not being able to get the funding without actors. Bridge financing, for example, can be used in scenarios where a filmmaker has a promissory note from an investor to finance a film provided the filmmaker can attach an approved actor, however without money to escrow for the actor's payment, the filmmaker is unable to meet the investor's criteria. In this instance, a short-term lender can provide a bridge loan to secure the actor with the promissory note as collateral; once the actor's payment is escrowed, the equity investment would be triggered, and the bridge loan would be paid back with a small interest. In Canada, this form of financing is more commonly known as "greenlight financing".

=== Slate financing ===
A relatively new method of financing, slate financing "involves an investment in a specified number of studio films ranging from a mere handful to dozens of pictures", typically by private equity firms and hedge funds. Slate financing's proliferation typifies the "complex relationship that has developed between the studios and Wall Street". Between 2005 and 2008, hedge funds invested an estimated $4 billion in studio film slates and private equity firms invested $8 billion.

The idea for slate financing came from "multifilm credit lines" that banks and investment firms created for studios in the late 1990s. There were three main advantages to this strategy: risk mitigation (since funds covered a pool of movies rather than one film), less interference from investors, and freeing up studio equity towards "big-budget franchises" for which they do not have trouble fundraising. In 2005, Relativity Media CEO Ryan Kavanaugh built upon these points to structure the first slate financing deal, a 17-picture joint deal with Sony Pictures and Universal Studios called Gun Hill Road that was backed by $600 million from hedge funds. Slate financing preserved the benefits of the earlier credit lines, as it allows them to risk less of their own capital when financing high-budget films. After deducting production costs, including prints and advertising (P&A) and residuals, studios split remaining box office revenue with investing partners; oftentimes they also split revenue from DVD and merchandise sales.

Generally tax-advantaged theatrical film and television investment for affluent individuals comes with little risk. In general, production costs can be recouped through federal and state tax incentives, thereby eliminating most of the risk. Capital is still required as a direct investment (partnerships can be used), but must also be "at risk", which allows § 181 IRC write-offs. For example, if a private equity source is found (individuals with capital or a private wealth management firm representing personal funds), the investor pays for the film or TV production, and in return receives an equal amount of capital in tax-incentives, pre-sales, and state tax credits, thereby making the investment and recoup a wash. This is a highly specialized tax play, and is often looked upon as risky by those who do not understand the risk mitigation offered through state tax and federal tax incentives like § 181 IRC.

=== Individual investors ===
One of the hardest types of film financing pieces to obtain is private investor funds. These are funds invested by an individual who is looking to possibly add more risk to their investment portfolio, or a high-net-worth individual with a keen interest in films. While there are a few steps to cover between development funding and capital funding, with regard to the latter, any capital funding that is approached, whether that source is private equity (private individuals and /or funding groups), or debt financing (finance institutions and /or banks), is going to require that you have certain necessary elements in place before they consider financing your project. These elements include marketplace analytics, audience analytics, a bondable schedule and budget, and a distribution plan.

=== Crowdfunding ===
A video pitch on website Indiegogo for the film Being Impossible, which was successfully crowdfunded after the Crisis in Venezuela devalued previous funding awarded to the film

With a rising popularity of online crowdfunding more and more films are getting financed directly by their consumers this way. The crowdfunding platforms Kickstarter and IndieGoGo have their own categories dedicated to films.

Crowdfunding films gives the consumer a voice in what films are being produced, allow for riskier, more socially relevant, more innovative, less profit-oriented independent films with smaller and marginal target audiences that can't be found in mainstream cinema and lower the entry-barrier to new filmmakers. Crowdfunded films include Iron Sky, Kung Fury, Veronica Mars, Code 8, Star Trek: Renegades, Manthan and Anomalisa.

== See also ==
- Box office futures
- Film budgeting
- Hollywood accounting
- Option (filmmaking)
- Product placement
