= Paul Merton's Secret Stations =

British television series

- Genre: Travel documentary
- Presented by: Paul Merton
- Country of origin: United Kingdom
- Original language: English
- No. of series: 1
- No. of episodes: 3

Production
- Running time: 60 minutes

Original release
- Network: Channel 4
- Release: 1 May – 15 May 2016

Paul Merton's Secret Stations is a British travel documentary television series, first broadcast on 1 May 2016 on Channel 4. Presented by Paul Merton, the series focuses on some of the little used stations in Great Britain which operate as request stops. Reviews were largely positive but not overly so, focussing on both the subject matter and Merton's contribution to argue how the series elevated itself above other series in the genre.

== Genesis ==
The series was one of a number of new commissions by More4 which focused on "traditional Britain" with series fronted by celebrities.

== Synopsis ==
The series was inspired by travel writer Dixe Wills' 2014 book Tiny Stations, and Wills is interviewed in the first episode. The introduction to the series explains that the railway network of Great Britain has a total of 152 request stops, "tiny, out of the way stations", a relatively small total (around 6%) of the total number found on the network's 21,000 miles (34,000 km) of track. It argues that these are often the most overlooked stations in terms of travelogues, and so deserve to be visited to explore their secrets, many of which will be unknown as they are by definition, not on the tourist trail. Merton visits 17 stations (listed below), some of which are on the same line - and while most are in remote rural areas (by virtue of the fact that request stops are for little used stations), the series also includes some urban locations. During a visit, Merton covers both the history of the station, and of associated people or places.

=== Stations ===
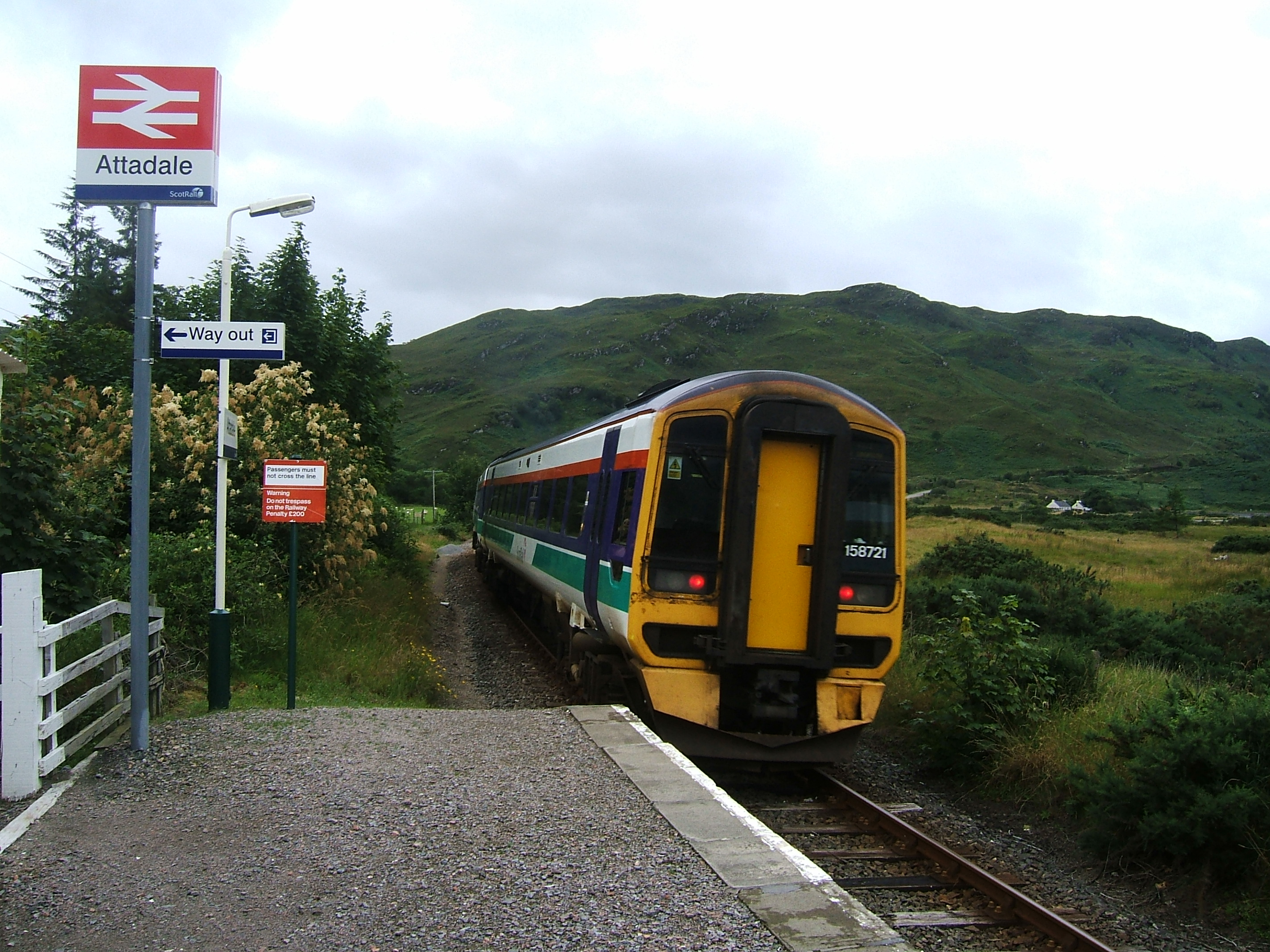
Attadale station, the first stop visited in the series

Station	Area	Country	Episode
Attadale	Highlands	Scotland	1
Beasdale	Highlands	Scotland	2
Braystones	Cumbria	England	2
Burnley Barracks	Lancashire	England	3
Corrour	Highlands	Scotland	3
Denton	Greater Manchester	England	3
Drigg	Cumbria	England	1
Ferryside	Carmarthenshire	Wales	2
Lapford	Devon	England	3
Luxulyan	Cornwall	England	3
Newton St Cyres	Devon	England	2
Penally	Pembrokeshire	Wales	3
Pontarddulais	Carmarthenshire	Wales	2
Reddish South	Greater Manchester	England	3
Silecroft	Cumbria	England	1
St Andrews Road	Bristol	England	2
St Keyne Wishing Well Halt	Cornwall	England	1

As the first series ended, Dixe Wills writing in a piece for The Guardian said there were still more than enough interesting request stops to justify a second series, pointing to the examples of Bootle, Buckenham, Conwy, Dolgarrog, Dunrobin Castle, Llanfairpwll, Lympstone Commando, The Lakes and Penychain.

== Production ==
The series was made by Brown Bob Productions Ltd for Channel 4, executive produced by Jacqueline Hewer, and directed by Ewen Thomson. The series makes extensive use of aerial filming.

== Presenter ==
Although Merton is primarily known as a comedian and as a panelist on Have I Got News For You, he had also been presenting travel documentaries since 2007. In the introduction to the series he explains he "loves railways and everything about them", and that his fascination with rail travel stemmed from the fact his father was a train driver on the London Underground (Merton himself preferring journeys with a view). Despite his love of train travel, he stated he hadn't known about the concept of request stops until making the series. The spokespeople for the campaign group Friends of Reddish South Station, who featured in the series, praised Merton's level of knowledge and evident research into their campaign.

== Broadcast ==
The series was first broadcast on Channel 4 in the 8 pm – 9 pm slot on Sunday nights.

== Episodes ==
No.	Original release date
1	1 May 2016
Attadale railway station - Paul boards the Caledonian Sleeper service in Euston, changing trains at Inverness, to travel to Attadale on the Kyle of Lochalsh Line. He is met by Joanna and Alec Macpherson, owners of the 30,000 acre Attadale estate, centred on an 8 bedroom house. Paul is taught how to artificially fertilise salmon on the estate's fishery.; Drigg railway station - Paul visits Drigg on the Cumbrian Coast Line, to visit the Low Level Waste Repository, a nuclear waste storage facility, where he is equipped with a protective suit to empty some waste bins inside the plant.; Silecroft railway station - also on the Cumbrian Coast Line, Paul visits the village of Silecroft, and joins the local fell running club, the Black Combe Runners, on a run.; Ferryside railway station - Paul meets Dixie Wills at Ferryside on the West Wales Line, to discuss the subject of request stops, and is allowed into the adjacent signal box to operate the traditional lever frame.; St Keyne Wishing Well Halt railway station - Paul visits a stop on the Looe Valley Line to visit the wishing well of Saint Keyne, and is informed by Paul, a local musical instrument specialist, that the legend behind the well is that when a newly married couple visit the well on their wedding day, "Whosoever drinketh the water first, be it man or wife, will be the master for life."
2	8 May 2016
Beasdale railway station - Paul travels from Fort William up the West Highland Line, alighting at Beasdale to visit Arisaig House, location of a training school of the Special Operations Executive during the Second World War. He is shown around the house by its present owner, and then by Henrick, an amateur historian specialising in the SOE, who also takes Paul metal detecting in the estate, to find evidence of explosive sabotage training exercises.; St Andrews Road railway station - Paul meets Alan at 6.30am at Bristol, travelling up the Severn Beach Line to St Andrews Road, where he is given the chance to try out Alan's job as a picker at the supermarket chain Asdas distribution centre.; Braystones railway station - contemplating retirement in a remote location, Paul visits Braystones on the Cumbrian Coast Line, talking to locals living in the beach houses positioned in one line along the narrow gap between the railway line and beach.; Newton St Cyres railway station - Paul visits the village of Newton St Cyres on the Tarka Line in Devon, calling in at the pub The Beer Engine, interviewing the new owners, and the head brewer in its attached microbrewery.; Pontarddulais railway station - Paul visits the town of Pontarddulais on the Heart of Wales Line, learning of its reinvention as a bridal outfitting centre, visiting Marion, owner of the Pleser bridal shop, sitting on a family choosing a dress, before going on to visit the Pontarddulais Male Choir, joining in on a practice session.
3	15 May 2016
Penally railway station - Paul visits the village of Penally on the West Wales Line, in search of the remains of the World War I practice trenches, meeting with some members of the Penally History Group to explore the site, now designated as an ancient monument.; Luxulyan railway station - Paul visits the Cornish village of Luxulyan, on the Atlantic Coast Line, to explore the location of what was once the centre of the China clay industry. He visits the parish church, then meets Tom on the Treffry Viaduct, whose family had worked in the industry for several generations, and they explore the remnants of a former china clay quarry.; Burnley Barracks railway station - Paul visits Burnley Barracks station in search of the barracks it is named after, only to learn it was demolished to make way for roads, before trying out working at Banny's, Britains first ever purpose built drive-through fish and chip shop.; Reddish South railway station - Paul visits Reddish South on the Stockport to Stalybridge Line, to meet a couple campaigning for a better service form the station, which only has one train a week, in one direction, known as a parliamentary service because its only purpose is to forestall the official closure of the line using an Act of Parliament. The couple use it every week so as to be recorded in the official usage statistics, and Paul travels with them on the 5 minute journey to; Denton railway station where they all alight; Paul then chats with two brothers who are train enthusiasts who have been recording the train movements through the station.; Lapford railway station - Paul arrives at Lapford on the Tarka Line in Devon to visit the former Ambrosia factory next to it, now used as a storage facility by a removals business. Given a tour by manager George, he picks out features linked to Ambrosia; Paul then visits Martin, a military surplus collector on another part of the former factory site, purchasing from him a former Ambrosia milk churn for £20.; Corrour railway station - Paul boards the Caledonian Sleeper service in Euston, for the 550 mile journey to the Corrour Estate, visiting Jan, who runs the youth hostel a mile from the station.

== Reception ==
According to Claire Webb of the Radio Times, Merton was "in his element pootling around railways with a flat cap and a boyish grin". Sam Wollaston of The Guardian, attracted to the series by Merton as opposed to love for travelogues, also observed that Merton pootles about, in the process producing a gentle but rather nice addition to the genre. Ben Arnold of the same paper stated that "Beneath a curiously niche premise....is a fairly standard, albeit charming, British travelogue show". Gerard O'Donovan of The Telegraph gave it three out of fives stars, arguing that Merton's role was obviously to wring out something worth saying from unpromising prospects, also observing that he tootled about, concluding that the outcome was worth a look, but was unlikely to become destination viewing. According to the Press Association it was the combination of the obscure subject matter and Merton's comedic style that elevated this series above the many similar celebrity presented travelogues before it, arguing also that it is Merton's sheer enthusiasm for the subject matter that makes it engaging viewing. Matt Baylis of the Daily Express was less enthused, claiming the show's content was not always that interesting and even missed out pertinent details, leading him to lament that the show had not been presented by the expert, Dixe Wills, who featured in episode 1.
