= Trainspotting (film) =

1996 British film by Danny Boyle

- Theatrical release poster
- Directed by: Danny Boyle
- Screenplay by: John Hodge
- Based on: Trainspotting by Irvine Welsh
- Produced by: Andrew Macdonald
- Starring: Ewan McGregor; Ewen Bremner; Jonny Lee Miller; Kevin McKidd; Robert Carlyle; Kelly Macdonald
- Cinematography: Brian Tufano
- Edited by: Masahiro Hirakubo
- Production companies: Channel Four Films; Figment Films; Noel Gay Motion Picture Company
- Distributed by: PolyGram Filmed Entertainment
- Release date: 23 February 1996
- Running time: 93 minutes
- Country: United Kingdom
- Languages: English, Scots
- Budget: £1.5 million
- Box office: $72 million (£48 million)

Trainspotting is a 1996 British independent black comedy drama film directed by Danny Boyle, with Ewan McGregor, Ewen Bremner, Jonny Lee Miller, Kevin McKidd, Robert Carlyle and Kelly Macdonald in her film debut. It is written in English and Scots. Based on the 1993 novel by Irvine Welsh and inspired by the stage production of the same name, the film was released in the United Kingdom on 23 February 1996.

The film follows a group of heroin addicts in an economically depressed area of Edinburgh, led by a mentally ill and violent psychopathic narcissist who allows their life of crime, and their passage through life. Themes in the film include drug addiction and urban poverty and squalor in Edinburgh.

Trainspotting was released to critical acclaim and is regarded by many critics as one of the best films of the 1990s. The film was ranked tenth by the British Film Institute (BFI) in its list of Top 100 British films of the 20th century. In 2004, the film was voted the best Scottish film of all time in a general public poll. A 2017 poll of 150 actors, directors, writers, producers and critics for Time Out ranked it the tenth best British film ever. A sequel, T2 Trainspotting, was released in January 2017 by Sony Pictures Releasing through its TriStar Pictures label.

== Plot ==
Mark Renton, a 26-year-old unemployed heroin addict living with his parents in Leith, regularly takes drugs with his friends: treacherous, womanising James Bond fanatic Simon "Sick Boy" Williamson, and docile and bumbling Daniel "Spud" Murphy. Renton's other friends include aggressive alcoholic psychopath Francis "Franco" Begbie, who serves as the de facto leader of the group, and honest footballer Thomas "Tommy" Mackenzie, who both abstain from heroin use.

Tiring of his reckless lifestyle, Renton attempts to wean himself off heroin with a bare room, food, and opium suppositories from dodgy dealer Mikey Forrester. Developing diarrhoea, he has to relieve himself in the disgusting toilet of a betting shop, then imagines swimming in the filthy water as he retrieves the suppositories.

On a night out, Renton notices that his cessation of heroin use has increased his libido. He seduces Diane Coulston, returning to her home to have sex. The following morning, he is horrified to learn that she is underage and lives with her parents, whom Renton mistakes for her flatmates. Diane threatens to report him to the police if he does not continue the relationship.

After several unsuccessful attempts to reintegrate into society, Renton, Sick Boy, and Spud relapse into heroin use; Tommy also begins to join them after Lizzy dumps him due to their sex tape disappearing (which Renton had stolen). Despite the group's shock at the negligence-induced death of Dawn, the infant daughter of Sick Boy and fellow heroin user Allison, they still do not quit using. When Renton, Sick Boy, and Spud engage in shoplifting, Renton and Spud are caught while Sick Boy narrowly escapes.

While Spud receives a short custodial sentence, Renton avoids jail by entering a drug rehabilitation programme where he is given methadone to help him, but quickly relapses and nearly dies of a heroin overdose. Returning home, Renton is locked in his childhood bedroom by his parents and forced to go cold turkey. Following severe withdrawal punctuated by hallucinations of his friends, his parents on a game show answering questions related to HIV and visions of Dawn crawling on the ceiling, Renton is released upon the condition of an HIV test. Despite years of sharing syringes with other addicts, he tests negative. However, Renton learns that Tommy, who is now severely addicted to heroin, has tested HIV-positive.

On Diane's advice, Renton moves to London and works as a property letting agent. He begins to enjoy his new life of sobriety in London and corresponds with Diane, who updates him on home developments. Renton's attempt at a fresh start in London is soon hindered as both Begbie, wanted for a failed armed robbery, and Sick Boy, now trying to be a pimp and drug dealer, re-enter his life. Renton hides them in a property that has yet to be let but they end up assaulting some prospective tenants, causing Renton to be fired. The trio returns to Edinburgh, where they attend the funeral of Tommy, who has died of AIDS-complicated toxoplasmosis.

Following the funeral, Sick Boy asks Renton, Begbie, and Spud (recently released from prison) for help in buying two kilograms of pure heroin from Mikey Forrester, for £4,000, to sell on, with Renton needing to supply £2,000 of the asking price; he reluctantly agrees after Begbie threatens him. The four return to London and sell the heroin to a dealer for £16,000, and then head to a pub to celebrate. Renton is briefly left alone with Spud and asks him if he would take the money bag and cut out the others, but Spud refuses; however, a returning Sick Boy proclaims that he would leave with the bag if given the chance. Meanwhile, Begbie beats up another patron and in the ensuing brawl accidentally cuts Spud's hand with a pocket knife.

The next morning, Renton wakes up before the others in their shared hotel room, quietly steals the bag of money from Begbie, and leaves. Spud observes this but chooses not to follow Renton or warn the others. Begbie, discovering Renton and the money gone, destroys their hotel room in a blind rage. Renton leaves the group behind, promising himself that he will live a cleaner lifestyle. In a post-credit scene, Spud finds £4,000 left for him by Renton in a locker, and leaves with a smile.

== Cast ==
- Ewan McGregor as Mark "Rent Boy" Renton
- Ewen Bremner as Daniel "Spud" Murphy
- Jonny Lee Miller as Simon "Sick Boy" Williamson
- Robert Carlyle as Francis "Franco" Begbie
- Kevin McKidd as Thomas "Tommy" Mackenzie
- Kelly Macdonald as Diane Coulston
- Peter Mullan as Swanney "Mother Superior"
- Fiona Bell as Mrs Coulson
- Vincent Friell as Mr Coulson
- Pauline Lynch as Lizzy
- Susan Vidler as Allison
- Eileen Nicholas as Mrs Renton
- James Cosmo as Davie Renton
- Shirley Henderson as Gail Houston
- Stuart McQuarrie as Gav Temperley/American Tourist
- Irvine Welsh as Mikey Forrester
- Kevin Allen as Andreas
- Keith Allen as Hugo the Dealer, reprising his role from Shallow Grave (1994)
- Dale Winton as Game Show Host
- Lauren and Devon Lamb as Baby Dawn Williamson (uncredited)
- Calton Athletic Football Club

== Style and themes ==
Music has great importance in Danny Boyle's films, as evident by the best-selling soundtracks for Trainspotting and Slumdog Millionaire, both of which feature many pop and punk rock artists. In Boyle's view, songs can be "amazing things to use because they obviously bring a lot of baggage with them. They may have painful associations, and so they inter-breathe with the material you're using".

The combination of images and music with the setting of the criminal underworld has drawn comparisons to Pulp Fiction and the films of Quentin Tarantino, that had created a certain type of "90s indie cinema" which "strove to dazzle the viewer with self-conscious cleverness and empty shock tactics". This affected the shooting style of the film, which features "wildly imaginative" and "downright hallucinatory" visual imagery, achieved through a mix of "a handheld, hurtling camera", jump cuts, zoom shots, freeze frames and wide angles. This vigorous style contributed to the "breathless" pace that Boyle's films have been associated with.

For the look of the film, Boyle was influenced by the colours of Francis Bacon's paintings, which represented "a sort of in-between land—part reality, part fantasy". The scene where Renton (McGregor) dives into a toilet is a reference to Thomas Pynchon's 1973 novel Gravity's Rainbow.

== Production ==
=== Development ===
Producer Andrew Macdonald read Irvine Welsh's book on a plane in December 1993, and felt that it could be made into a film. He brought it to the attention of director Danny Boyle and writer John Hodge in February 1994. Boyle was excited by its potential to be the "most energetic film you've ever seen—about something that ultimately ends up in purgatory or worse". Hodge read it and made it his goal to "produce a screenplay which would seem to have a beginning, a middle and an end, would last 90 minutes and would convey at least some of the spirit and the content of the book". Boyle convinced Welsh to let them option the rights to his book by writing him a letter stating that Hodge and Macdonald were "the two most important Scotsmen since Kenny Dalglish and Alex Ferguson". Welsh remembered that originally the people wanting to option his book "wanted to make a po-faced piece of social realism like Christiane F or The Basketball Diaries". He was impressed that Boyle, Hodge and Macdonald wanted everyone to see the film and "not just the arthouse audience". In October 1994, Hodge, Boyle and Macdonald spent a lot of time discussing which chapters of the book would and would not translate into film. Hodge finished the first draft by December. Macdonald secured financing from Channel 4, a British television station known for funding independent films.

=== Casting ===
Pre-production began in April 1995. Ewan McGregor was cast after impressing Boyle and Macdonald with his work on their previous film, Shallow Grave. According to Boyle, for the role of Renton, they wanted the quality of Michael Caine's character Alfie Elkins in Alfie and Malcolm McDowell's character Alex DeLarge in A Clockwork Orange, "repulsive ... with charm 'that makes you feel deeply ambiguous about what he's doing'." McGregor shaved his head and lost 2 stone (12.7 kilograms/28 lbs) for the film. Ewen Bremner had played Renton in the stage adaptation of Trainspotting and agreed to play the role of Spud, saying he felt the characters "were part of my heritage". Boyle had heard about Jonny Lee Miller playing an American in the film Hackers and was impressed when he auditioned by doing a Sean Connery accent. For the role of Begbie, Boyle considered casting Christopher Eccleston for his resemblance to how he imagined the character in the novel, but asked Robert Carlyle instead. Carlyle was initially hesitant, believing he was too short to play the character, but Boyle convinced him by telling him, "No, small psychos are better." Carlyle said, "I've met loads of Begbies in my time. Wander round Glasgow on Saturday night and you've a good chance of running into Begbie." For the role of Diane, Boyle wanted an unknown actress so audiences would not realise that a 19-year-old was playing a 15-year-old. The filmmakers sent flyers to nightclubs and boutiques and approached people on the street, eventually hiring Kelly Macdonald. The casting of Keith Allen as the Dealer was a reference to his role in Shallow Grave with the implication being that he plays the same character in both.

=== Pre-production ===
McGregor read books about crack and heroin to prepare for the role. He also went to Glasgow and met people from the Calton Athletic Recovery Group, an organisation of recovering heroin addicts, who play the opposing football team in the opening credits. He was taught how to cook up heroin with a spoon using glucose powder. McGregor considered injecting heroin to better understand the character, but eventually decided against it. Many of the book's stories and characters were dropped to create a cohesive script of adequate length. Danny Boyle had his actors prepare by making them watch older films about rebellious youths like The Hustler and A Clockwork Orange.

=== Principal photography ===
Trainspotting was shot in mid-1995 over seven weeks on a budget of £1.5 million with the cast and crew working out of an abandoned cigarette factory in Glasgow. Due to time constraints and a tight budget, most scenes were done in one take, which contributed to the grungy look of the film. For example, when Renton sinks into the floor after overdosing on heroin, the crew built a platform above a trap door and lowered the actor down. The faeces in the 'Worst Toilet in Scotland' scene was made from chocolate.

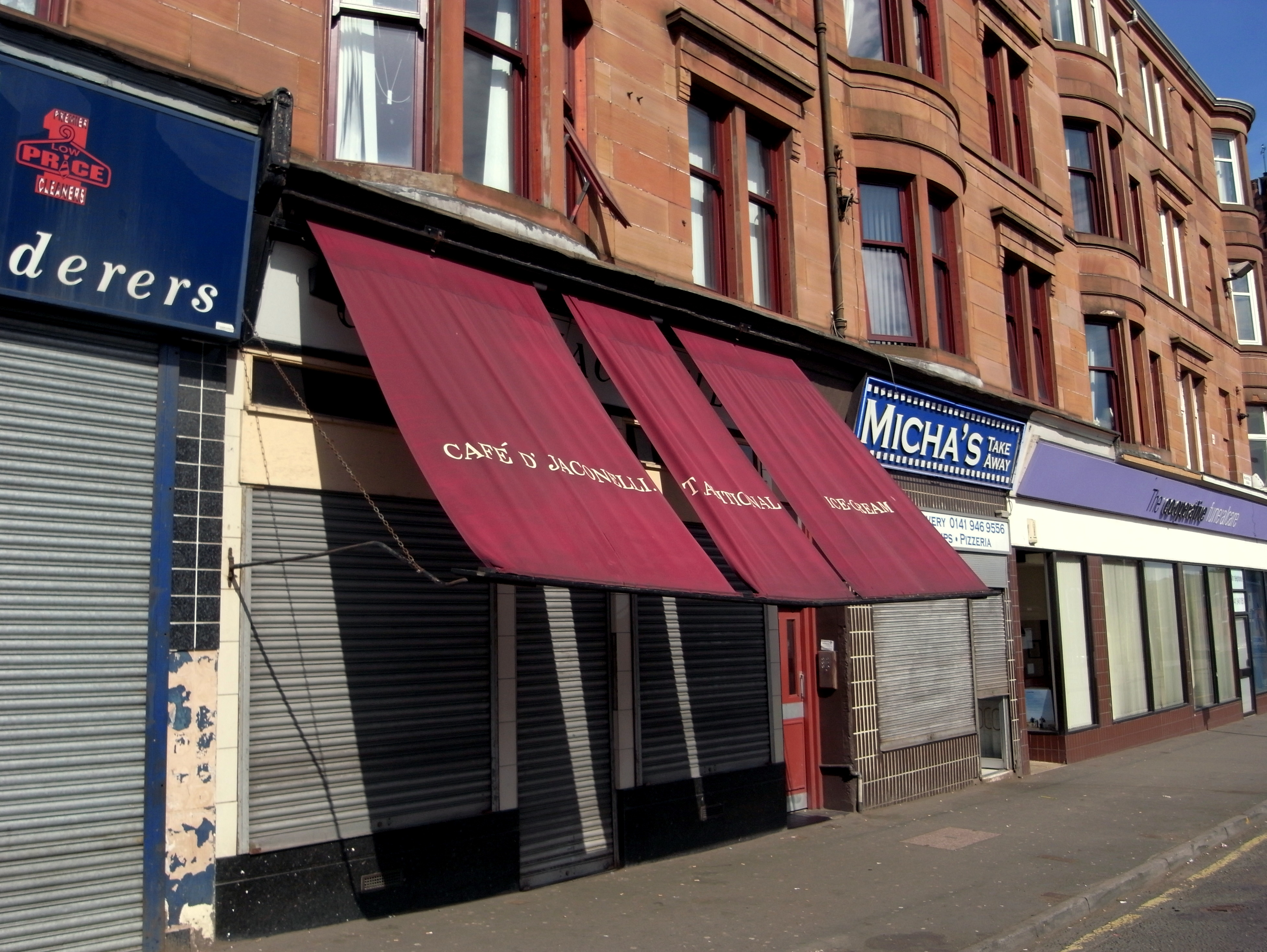
Café D'Jaconelli, the café where Renton and Spud share a milkshake, on Maryhill Road in Glasgow

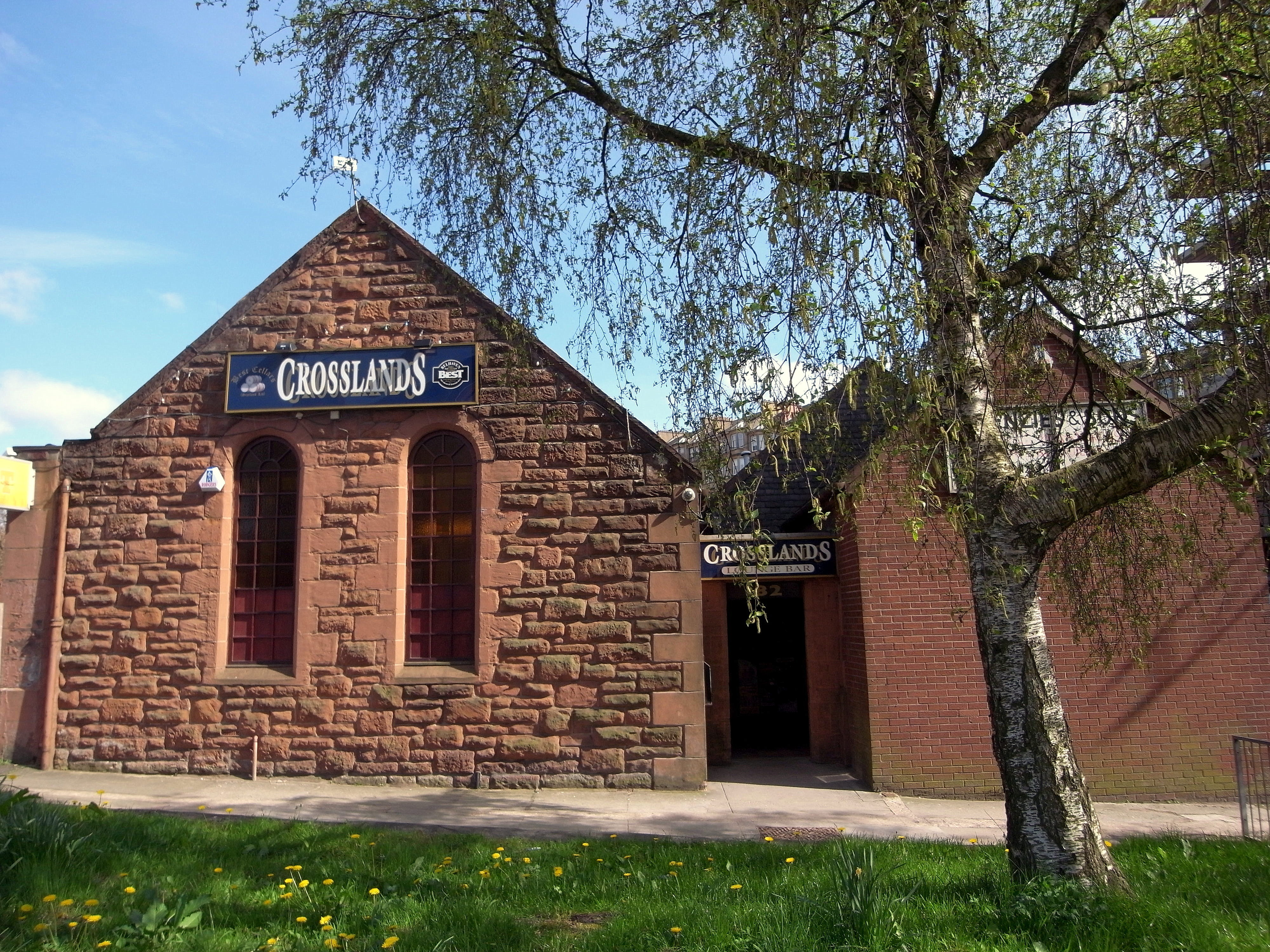
Crosslands pub in North Kelvinside features as the pub in which Begbie starts a bar brawl.

Despite the film being set in Edinburgh, almost the entirety of it was shot in Glasgow; the only scene that was actually filmed in the former was the opening chase scene.

Locations in the film include:

- The opening scene of Renton and Spud being chased by security for shoplifting is shot in Edinburgh, on Princes Street and Calton Road under Regent Bridge.
- The park where Sick Boy and Renton discuss James Bond, Sean Connery and The Name of the Rose is Rouken Glen Park in Giffnock, East Renfrewshire. The park was also the site of the titular grave in Boyle's previous film, Shallow Grave.
- Corrour railway station is the setting for the "great outdoors" scene in the film, where Tommy suggests the group climb Leum Uilleim.
- The scenes where the protagonists do their drug deal take place in Paddington. The scene where they parody the cover of the Beatles album Abbey Road takes place as they walk out of Smallbrook Mews across Craven Road to the Royal Eagle, 26–30 Craven Road, Paddington.
- The school attended by Diane is Jordanhill in Glasgow's West End.

== Soundtracks ==
The Trainspotting soundtracks were two best-selling albums of music based on the film. The first is a collection of songs featured in the film, while the second includes those left out from the first soundtrack and extra songs that inspired the filmmakers during production.

The soundtrack became a pop culture phenomenon. Nearly all of the score is pre-recorded music from existing artists. This score is divided into three distinct groups, all representing a different eras and styles: The first being pop music from the 1970s, by artists such as Lou Reed and Iggy Pop; who are all musicians closely associated with drug use and are referred to throughout the original novel. The second group is the music from the Britpop era in the 1990s, with bands Blur and Pulp. Finally, there is the techno-dance music from the 1990s, including Underworld, Bedrock and Ice MC. Danny Boyle approached Oasis about contributing a song to the soundtrack but Noel Gallagher turned down the opportunity due to him mistakenly believing it would be a film about actual trainspotters.

Through the years, acclaim for the soundtrack has been sustained. In 2007, Vanity Fair ranked the Trainspotting original soundtrack at number 7 for best motion picture soundtrack in history. Additionally, Entertainment Weekly ranked the Trainspotting soundtrack as 17th on their 100 best movie soundtracks list. In 2013, Rolling Stone listed it as the 13th best soundtrack in their 25 best soundtracks. In 2015, New Musical Express praised it as a "perfect snapshot of 1996 music."

1996 saw a drastic change in British music with the rise of popularity for Britpop, although old-fashioned pop was still firmly rooted in British culture. With Oasis dominating the singles chart and the Spice Girls on the rise, the Trainspotting soundtrack aimed to champion the alternative music legacy of 1996 Britain with a focus on presenting electronic music on equal footing with rock music in a way that had never been done before.

== Release ==
=== Marketing and theatrical release ===
Macdonald worked with American distributor Miramax Films to sell the film as a British Pulp Fiction, flooding the market with postcards, posters, books, soundtrack albums and a revamped music video for "Lust for Life" by Iggy Pop directed by Boyle.

Prior to its release in the United States, Miramax requested that some of the dialogue be dubbed so the film would be easier to understand for American viewers unfamiliar with Scottish slang and British slang in general.

PolyGram Filmed Entertainment, the company responsible for the distribution of the film, launched a publicity campaign of half as much as the film's production costs (£850000) in the UK alone, making the film stand out more as a Hollywood blockbuster rather than a smaller European production.

Trainspotting was able to portray itself as British and as an 'exotic' element to the international market while also staying relevant to the American public, making it an international success in its marketing.

In April 2026, it was announced Sony Pictures Classics would be re-releasing the film, restored in 4K, theatrically in the United States on June 5, coinciding with its 30th anniversary; SPC's sister company TriStar Pictures had previously handled distribution on the 2017 sequel T2 Trainspotting.

=== Home media ===
The film was released on VHS after its theatrical release. It was released on DVD on 25 March 1998, and on Blu-ray on 13 September 2011. A remastered version of the film was released in North America by The Criterion Collection on Blu-ray and 4K Ultra HD Blu-ray on January 30, 2024.

Paramount Home Entertainment re-released it on Blu-ray in 2021. Paramount later sublicensed their home video rights to Criterion for the 4K UHD and remastered Blu-ray releases in January 2024. In 2024, Trainspotting's original British owners Film4 sublicensed the home video rights to Spirit Entertainment, who released it in the UK on 4K UHD in November 2024.

== Reception ==
Trainspotting was screened at the 1996 Cannes Film Festival but was shown out of competition, according to the filmmakers, due to its subject.

The film had previews in the UK on 17 screens, grossing £18970, before opening on 23 February 1996 in a platform release on 57 screens in the West End of London, Scotland and Ireland, grossing £532950 in its opening weekend and placing fifth at the UK box office. It was the number one film in London. It expanded nationwide to 245 screens in its third week of release and was the number one film in the UK with a gross of £1422906 for the weekend.

By the time it opened in North America, on 19 July 1996, the film had grossed more than $18 million in Britain. It initially opened in eight theatres in the U.S. and Canada and on its first weekend grossed $33,000 per screen. The film expanded to 357 screens and made $16.4 million in North America, one of the biggest grossing films of 1996 in limited release. Trainspotting was the highest-grossing British film of 1996, and at the time it was the fourth highest grossing British film in history. The film grossed £12 million in the UK and $72 million internationally. Based on a cost-to-return ratio, Trainspotting was the most profitable film of the year.

=== Critical reception ===
The film has an approval rating of 93% on Rotten Tomatoes based on 174 reviews collected by the site, with an average score of 8.5/10. The site's critical consensus reads: "Breathlessly kinetic, darkly hilarious, and unapologetically transgressive, Trainspotting transforms the highs and lows of addiction into a ferociously stylish feat of cinematic invention." On Metacritic, the film has a weighted average score of 83 out of 100 based on 28 reviews, indicating "universal acclaim". In his review for The Guardian, Derek Malcolm gave the film credit for tapping into the youth subculture of the time and felt that it was "acted out with a freedom of expression that's often astonishing." Empire magazine gave the film five out of five stars and described the film as "something Britain can be proud of and Hollywood must be afraid of. If we Brits can make movies this good about subjects this horrific, what chance does Tinseltown have?"

American film critic Roger Ebert gave the film three out of four stars and praised its portrayal of addicts' experiences with each other. On At the Movies, Gene Siskel believed film's portrayal of the joys of heroin overshadowed its horrors, and agreed with Ebert's assessment of Trainspotting as "not a great movie, but a good movie." Both critics gave it a thumbs up. In his review for the Los Angeles Times, Kenneth Turan wrote, "in McGregor ... the film has an actor whose magnetism monopolizes our attention no matter what". Entertainment Weekly gave the film an "A" rating and Owen Gleiberman wrote, "Like Scorsese and Tarantino, Boyle uses pop songs as rhapsodic mood enhancers, though in his own ravey-hypnotic style. Whether he's staging a fumbly sex montage to Sleeper's version of "Atomic" or having Renton go cold turkey to the ominous slow build of Underworld's "Dark and Long" ... Trainspotting keeps us wired to the pulse of its characters' passions". In her review for The New York Times, Janet Maslin wrote, "Trainspotting doesn't have much narrative holding it together. Nor does it really have the dramatic range to cope with such wild extremes. Most of it sticks to the same moderate pitch, with entertainment value enhanced by Mr. Boyle's savvy use of wide angles, bright colours, attractively clean compositions and a dynamic pop score".

Rolling Stone's Peter Travers wrote, "the film's flash can't disguise the emptiness of these blasted lives. Trainspotting is 90 minutes of raw power that Boyle and a bang-on cast inject right into the vein". In his review for The Washington Post, Desson Howe wrote, "Without a doubt, this is the most provocative, enjoyable pop-cultural experience since Pulp Fiction". Jonathan Rosenbaum, in his review for the Chicago Reader, wrote, "Like Twister and Independence Day, this movie is a theme-park ride – though it's a much better one, basically a series of youthful thrills, spills, chills, and swerves rather than a story intended to say very much".

The film's release sparked controversy in some countries, including Britain, Australia and the United States, as to whether or not it promoted and romanticised drug use. U.S. Senator Bob Dole accused it of moral depravity and glorifying drug use during the 1996 U.S. presidential campaign, although he later admitted that he had not seen the film. Producer of the film Andrew Macdonald responded to these claims in a BBC interview stating "we were determined to show why people took drugs ... you had to show that it was fun and that it was awful" to which Boyle adds "It's the music and humour that makes people feel it's glamorising drugs." Despite the controversy, it was widely praised and received a nomination for Best Adapted Screenplay in that year's Academy Awards. Time magazine ranked Trainspotting as the third best film of 1996.

=== Legacy ===
The film had an immediate effect on popular culture. In 1999, Trainspotting was ranked in the tenth spot by the British Film Institute (BFI) in its list of Top 100 British films of all time, while in 2004 the magazine Total Film named it the fourth greatest British film of all time. That same year, Channel 4 named it as the greatest British film of all time. The Observer polled several filmmakers and film critics who voted it the best British film in the last 25 years. In 2004, the film was voted the best Scottish film of all time by the public in a poll for The List magazine. Trainspotting has developed a cult following. It was recognised as an important film during the 1990s British cultural tour de force known as Cool Britannia. It was also featured in the documentary Live Forever: The Rise and Fall of Brit Pop.

The film title is a reference to a scene in the book where Begbie and Renton meet "an auld drunkard" who turns out to be Begbie's estranged father, in the disused Leith Central railway station, which they are using as a toilet. He asks them if they are "trainspottin'". This scene is later included as a flashback in T2 Trainspotting.

The music video for the 2019 song "Doorman" by English rapper Slowthai contains several references to the film.

In 2025, rapper Rome Streetz released the album Trainspotting, a collaboration with producer Conductor Williams. It was named for the film.

=== Awards ===
Trainspotting was nominated for two British Academy Film Awards at the 49th British Academy Film Awards in 1996, Best British Film and John Hodge for Best Adapted Screenplay. Hodge won in his category. Hodge also won Best Screenplay from the Evening Standard British Film Awards. The film won the Golden Space Needle (the award for Best Film) at the 1996 Seattle International Film Festival. Ewan McGregor tied with Ian McKellen for Richard III for Best British Actor of the Year at the London Film Critics Circle Awards 1996 for his work in this film as well as Brassed Off, Emma and The Pillow Book. McGregor was also named Best Actor at the BAFTA Scotland Awards, and by Empire magazine. Hodge was also nominated for the Academy Award for Best Adapted Screenplay at the 69th Academy Awards but lost to Billy Bob Thornton's Sling Blade.

== Sequel ==
Boyle had declared his wish to make a sequel to Trainspotting which would take place nine years after the original film, based on Irvine Welsh's sequel, Porno. He was reportedly waiting until the original actors themselves aged visibly enough to portray the same characters, ravaged by time; Boyle joked that the natural vanity of actors would make it a long wait. Ewan McGregor stated in an interview that he would return for a sequel, saying "I'm totally up for it. I'd be so chuffed to be back on set with everybody and I think it would be an extraordinary experience."

On 6 May 2014, during a BBC Radio interview with Richard Bacon, Welsh confirmed that he had spent a week with Boyle, Andrew Macdonald and the creative team behind Trainspotting to discuss the sequel. Welsh stated that the meeting was to "explore the story and script ideas. We're not interested in doing something that will trash the legacy of Trainspotting. ... We want to do something that's very fresh and contemporary." Welsh did not however confirm any kind of timeline for the film, unlike Boyle's comments about wanting the film to come out in 2016.

In a newspaper interview with The Scotsman on 17 November 2014, Welsh said that McGregor and Boyle had resolved their differences and had held meetings about the film, saying "I know Danny and Ewan are back in touch with each other again. There are others in the cast who've had a rocky road, but now also reconciled. With the Trainspotting sequel the attention is going to be even more intense this time round because the first was such a great movie—and Danny's such a colossus now. We're all protective of the Trainspotting legacy and we want to make a film that adds to that legacy and doesn't take away from it."

In a September 2015 interview with ComingSoon.net, Boyle said that a script for the sequel had been written, and that filming would take place between May and June 2016, in the hope of releasing the film that year to commemorate Trainspotting's 20th anniversary.

T2 Trainspotting was released in the UK on 27 January 2017, and worldwide in February and March 2017. It received generally positive reviews from critics and was a commercial success, grossing $42.1 million against a production budget of $18 million. It is a black comedy-drama film, directed by Boyle and written by John Hodge. Set in and around Edinburgh, it is based on characters created by Welsh in his 1993 novel Trainspotting and its 2002 follow-up Porno. T2 stars the original ensemble cast, including leads Ewan McGregor, Ewen Bremner, Jonny Lee Miller, and Robert Carlyle, with Shirley Henderson, James Cosmo, and Kelly Macdonald. The film features a new character, Veronika, played by Anjela Nedyalkova, and includes clips, music, and archive sound from the first film.

== See also ==
- List of cult films
- Reindeerspotting: Escape from Santaland

== Bibliography ==
- Smith, Murray (2002). Trainspotting. London: British Film Institute. ISBN 978-0-85170-870-6. OCLC 762340066.
- Welsh, Irvine (1997). Trainspotting. Minerva. ISBN 978-0-7493-8520-0.
