= Raappana =

Raappana may refer to:

== People ==
- Raappana (musician), Finnish reggae artist
- Erkki Raappana (1893–1962), Finnish major general
- Jani Raappana (died 2010), the main subject of the 2010 Finnish documentary film Reindeerspotting: Escape from Santaland
- Janne Raappana (born 1977), Finnish singer who competed in Euroviisut 2010
- Jouko Raappana, Finnish rally co-driver who competed in the 1974 1000 Lakes Rally
- Juho Raappana (1869–1923), Finnish journalist who founded the Finnish newspaper Kaleva
- Juho Raappana, Finnish drummer of the Finnish band Eternal Tears of Sorrow
- Oliva V. Raappana, Canadian politician, riding of Edmonton West
- Sami Joonas Raappana, Finnish weightlifter who competed at the 2017 Summer Universiade

=== Fictional characters ===
- Raappana, in the 1909 Finnish novel Punainen viiva, the 1959 film Red Line and the 1978 opera The Red Line
- Taisto Raappana, in the 2012 Finnish crime film Vares: The Path of the Righteous Men

== Other ==
- Group Raappana, a Finnish military formation during the Battle of Ilomantsi
