= Ginseng coffee =

Beverage made from coffee and ginseng root

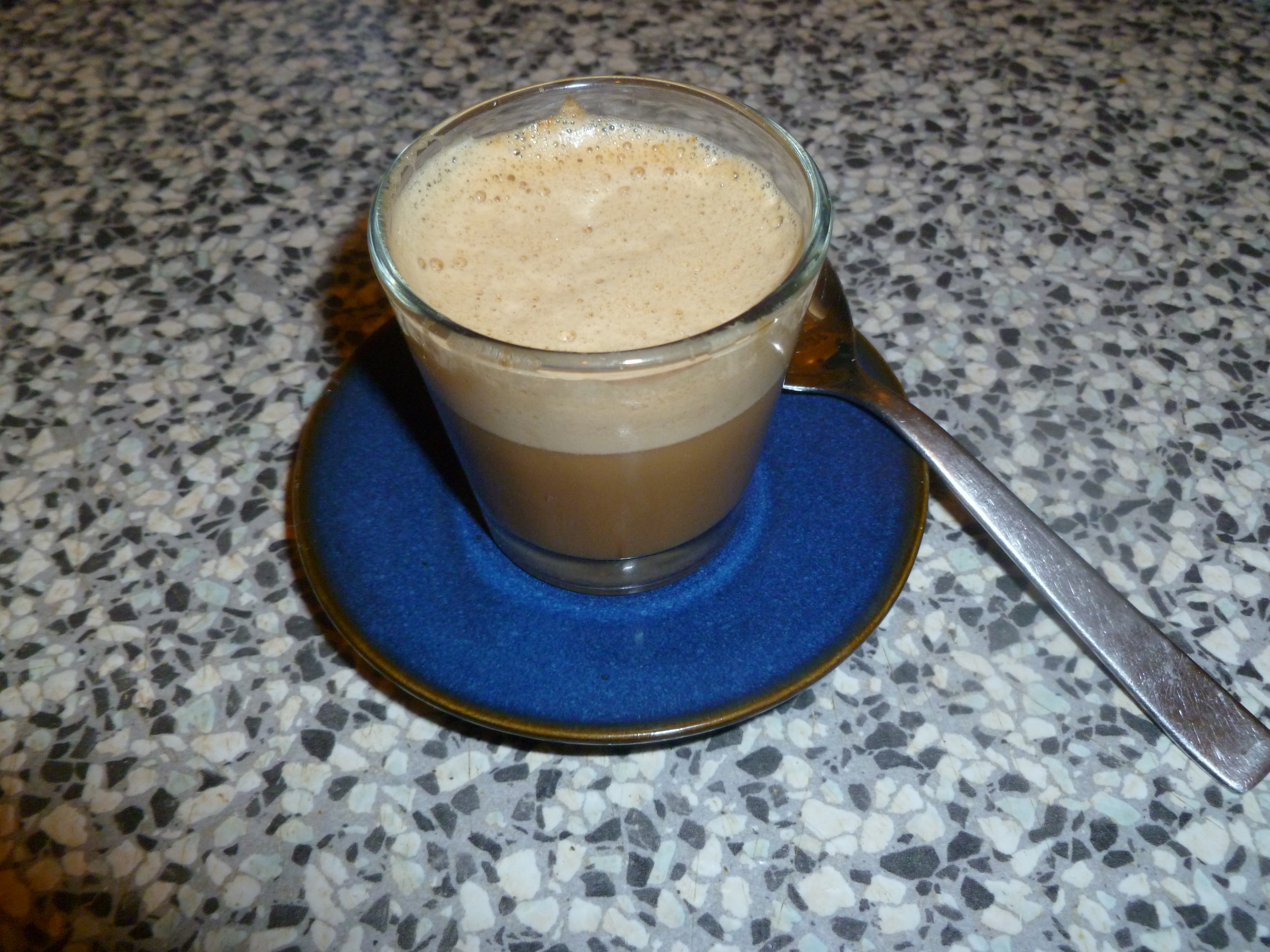
Ginseng coffee

Ginseng coffee is a beverage prepared from coffee and ginseng root.

In Indonesia, the company Citra Nusa Insan Cemerlang (CNI) began marketing ginseng coffee in 1994. By the early 2010s, ginseng coffee products had been marketed in China, India, Japan, Malaysia, the Philippines, and South Korea. At that time the typical production process consisted of simple mixing of ginseng powder and instant coffee powder. Several authors with the Korea Food Research Institute conducted research into a new production process whereby whole coffee beans would be coated with ginseng extract following roasting and then ground and brewed.

Ginseng coffee later became popular in Italy. It reportedly arrived in Milan in the mid-2000s. It was described by one journalist as being offered by "almost all" coffee bars and coffee machines by 2019. In 2018, one study of energy drink consumption by university students in Verona found that among the 37.4% of students who reported consuming ginseng, beverages combining ginseng and coffee were the "most often used combination" at 71.8%; it was more popular among female students than male students. Writer Dixe Wills described a ginseng coffee he had in Milan as "tasting nothing at all like coffee".
