= Leum Uilleim =

Coordinates: 56.73855°N 4.73190°W

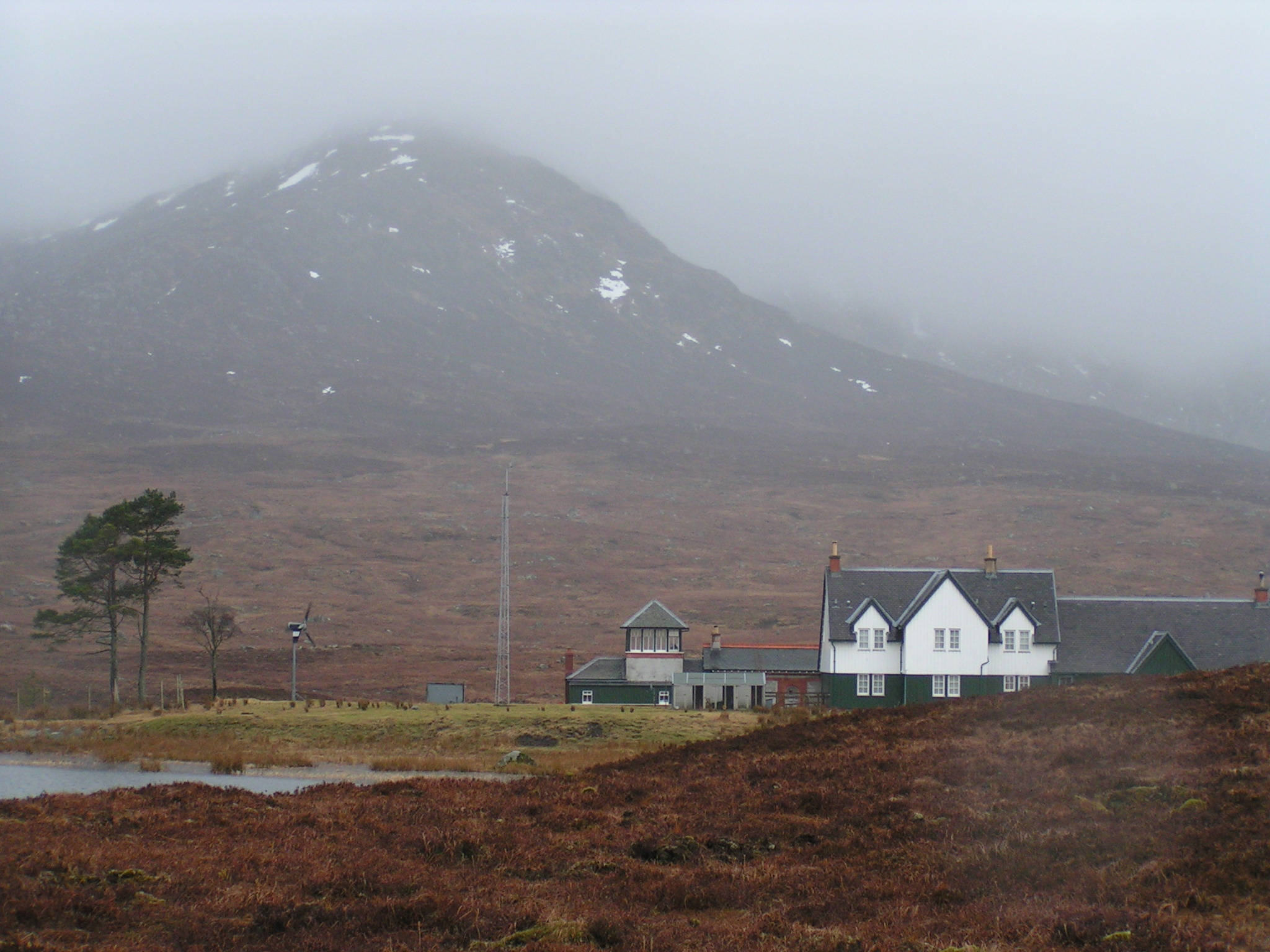
- Leum Uilleum with Corrour Station in foreground

Highest point
- Elevation: 909 m (2,982 ft)
- Prominence: c. 544 m
- Listing: Corbett, Marilyn

Naming
- English translation: William's Leap
- Language of name: Scottish Gaelic
- Pronunciation: Scottish Gaelic: [ʎeːm ˈuʎɛm]

Geography
- Location: Highland, Scotland
- Parent range: Grampian Mountains
- OS grid: NN330641

Leum Uilleim is a mountain in Lochaber, Highland, Scotland which appeared in the film Trainspotting. It is situated about 3 km south-west of the remote Corrour railway station, but is considerably farther from any road.
