= Negative pickup deal =

Film production contract

In film production, a negative pickup is a contract entered into by an independent producer and a movie studio conglomerate wherein the studio agrees to purchase the movie from the producer at a given date and for a fixed sum. It is one of various types of film distribution agreements. Depending on whether the studio pays part or all of the cost of the film, the studio will receive the rights (theatrical, television, home entertainment) domestic or international to the film, with net profits split between the producer and the studio.

The word "negative" in this context can be confusing because it does not relate to a numerical value (where negative means less than zero), but instead comes from the pre-digital era in which a motion picture was embodied in physical film negatives.

== Background ==
By selling the rights to distribute the film in territories not covered in the negative pickup ("pre-selling") or making other deals collateral to the production, a producer will usually cover all their costs and make a small profit before production has begun. But financing of the production up to its completion date is the responsibility of the producer—if the film goes over budget, the producer must pay the difference themselves or go back to the studio and renegotiate the deal. This happened on the films Superman, The Empire Strikes Back, Never Say Never Again, The Thief and the Cobbler, and Lone Survivor.

Most negative pickup contracts, either from motion picture studios or television networks, are bankable at pretty much dollar for dollar (less fees); if one holds a negative pickup contract, one essentially holds a cheque from the studio for the cost of the film, post-dated to the day one delivers the film to them. So, while the studio technically does not pay the producer until the film negative is officially delivered (thus "negative pickup"), the producer can nonetheless get a bank loan against a negative pickup contract, which helps them to pay for production of the film.

Studios, on the other hand, typically do not like their contracts being factored at banks or shopped around to independent investors and financiers, as this ultimately gives the producer significant creative latitude over the production. With the money assured, a producer has a free hand to make the film however they please, and they are only answerable to their investors, which in this scenario are unknown to the studio at the time of the contract. If creative disagreements arise between the studio and the producer, the studio has little contractual recourse as long as the film meets certain general contractual requirements, such as duration and technical quality. An example of this is Terry Gilliam's Brazil, a negative pickup for Universal Pictures produced by Arnon Milchan. In this particular case, the studio had creative disagreements with the director over choice of star, content, and duration, and failed to resolve these issues to its satisfaction, because the negative pickup had essentially granted Milchan final cut.

The studios and distributors will contain this risk by offering the negative pickup contract only to a production that has financiers, a script, and key creative personnel, particularly the director and stars, already attached. Thus the conundrum: unless a film has U.S. distribution, a lot of investors and foreign buyers will not pre-buy a film, and unless the film is already financed, the studios do not want to guarantee distribution. This catch-22 is often resolved by attaching a major actor to the film; the mere appearance of an American movie star's name on a film's poster is often enough to drive box office to cover distribution in many foreign markets.

== See also ==
- Film finance
- Film rights
