= Geal-Chàrn =

Mountain in Highland, Scotland

Coordinates: 56°50′11″N 4°30′00″W

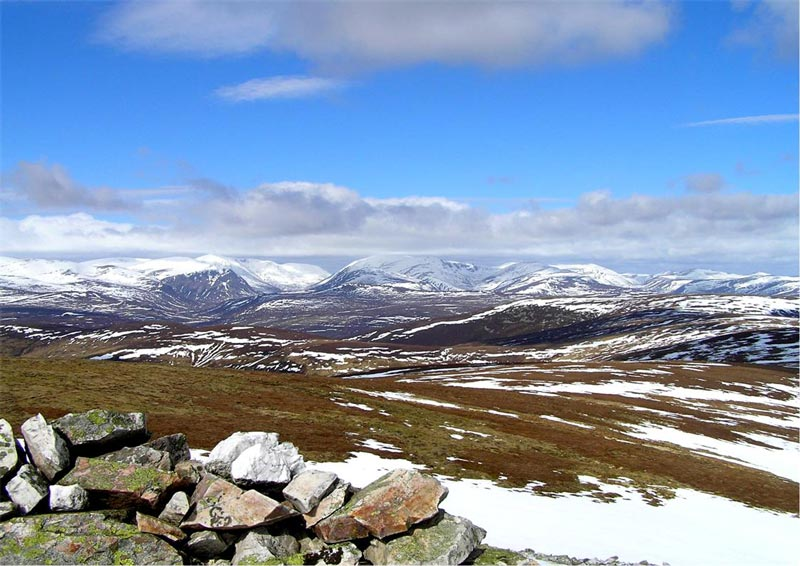
- The cairngorms from geal charn

Highest point
- Elevation: 1,132 m (3,714 ft)
- Prominence: 410 m (1,350 ft)
- Listing: Munro, Marilyn

Naming
- English translation: White Peak
- Language of name: Gaelic

Geography
- OS grid: NN470746
- Topo map: OS Landranger 41

Geal-Chàrn (Scottish Gaelic: White Peak) is a mountain in the Highlands of Scotland, 14 kilometres North East of Corrour railway station

== See also ==
- Ben Nevis
- List of Munro mountains
- Mountains and hills of Scotland
