= Epagogix =

British company

Epagogix is a UK-based company founded in 2003 that uses neural networks and analytical software to predict which movies will provide a good possibility of return on investments and which movie scripts or plots will be successful. It was featured in an article by Malcolm Gladwell in The New Yorker. It has also been featured in Super Crunchers, Ian Ayres' book about number analysis, in CIO magazine and in Kevin Slavin's TED talk.

The Epagogix system uses a "computer enhanced algorithm" which uses data from an archive of films which analysts have broken down into hundreds of categories or plot points, such as "love scene" or "car chase". A film's script is assigned scores for these categories by an Epagogix employee, and the scores fed into a computer algorithm which estimates how much that film might take at the box office, plus or minus around ten per cent. The software may also recommend script changes.

As part of a reported testing process, the Epagogix software predicted that the $50 million 2007 film Lucky You would "bomb" and take only $7 million. Upon release, the film took $6 million. The company also interpreted the software's analysis of Casablanca as considering it "gloomy, downbeat and too long".
