= Option (filmmaking) =

Filmmaking contract

In the film industry, an option agreement is a contract that "rents" the rights to a source material to a potential film producer. It grants the film producer the exclusive option to purchase rights to the source material if they live up to the terms of the contract and make a film (or series) from it. This is known as optioning the source material.

Some examples of producers are film studios, production companies or an individual. Source materials are often a book, theatrical play, or screenplay; however, they may also be articles, video games, songs, or any other work of intellectual property.

The term is often used as a verb. For example, "Paramount optioned a short story by Ted Chiang."

== Overview ==
When a work is optioned, the producer has not actually purchased the right to use the source material; they have simply purchased the option to purchase the rights to the work at some point in the future, if they are successful in setting up a deal to actually film a movie (or series) based on it.

Purchasing the actual rights to a work is called "exercising" the option. This requires another contract, the "Rights Purchase Agreement".

Option agreements detail the rights of the producer and the original author, including how long the agreement lasts, the fees paid to the author, and any plans for rights associated with derivative works (for example, a future prequel to a book). The producer usually has to outline their plan for financing, writing, casting, and shooting the film or series.

Financially, the contract qualifies as a financial option and may be valued by applying real options analysis.

=== Exclusivity ===
Film option agreements last for a set amount of time, which is called the "option period" and is often around eighteen months.

After the option period expires, the producer no longer has an exclusive right to buy the screenplay and the original work's rights are returned to the author.

=== Fees ===
Most option agreements have two option periods, which have separate timelines and fees. The initial option fee is negotiated during the original agreement. They vary greatly from deal to deal.

The fee for the first option period can be detracted from any income received from the project after the original work is exercised, while the fee for the extension cannot.

A portion of the film's financing is usually used to pay the exercise price. This is also called the "purchase price". The producer has until the end of the last extension period to exercise the option.

== Producer's role during the option period ==
During the option period, the producers often:

1. Get the screenplay written (if the option was on a book or other work, and not a screenplay);
2. Obtain informal agreements with the director, the principal actors, the film crew, and the financiers;
3. Take it to a movie studio or other potential financier and potentially help with distribution (pre-sales);
4. Finalize the screenplay to the agreement of all stakeholders—the exclusivity of the option allows this step without risk of a rival attempt to produce the same property.

This process can last for a prolonged period of time known as development hell.

If all planning falls into place, actual agreements are signed, financing is secured, and the option fee is paid, then the producer can start pre-production.

=== Options in Hollywood ===
Options are not expensive by the standards of Hollywood movies. For True Romance, Quentin Tarantino received US$50,000 to option his script. Many writers are happy to receive a few thousand dollars. Option contracts typically specify the eventual cost of the screenplay, if the producer does end up exercising the option.

Since optioning a screenplay is far cheaper than buying it, options are very popular in Hollywood for speculative projects.

== See also ==
- Box office futures
- Option (law)
- Real option
- Film budgeting
- Film finance
- Hollywood accounting
