= Box office futures =

Type of futures contract

In finance, box office futures is a type of futures contract in which investors speculate on upcoming movies based on their predicted performance.

== United States ==
In the United States the idea of a futures trading in relation to the success of Hollywood films dates back at least to 1996, when Max Keiser and Michael R. Burns launched Hollywood Stock Exchange (HSX) as a web-based, multiplayer game in which players use simulated money to buy and sell "shares" of actors, directors, upcoming films, and film-related options. After some attention during the dot-com bubble, HSX was bought in 2001 by the financial company Cantor Fitzgerald who planned to turn it into a real-money trading exchange, but the devastation of Cantor Fitzgerald during the 9/11 attacks put the project on hold.

In 2007, Arizona-based entrepreneur Robert Swagger formed Media Derivatives Inc. (MDEX) with the goal of creating an electronic futures exchange for contracts based on box office results. The idea behind MDEX was that it could be used by large film studios to recoup some of the money invested in failing movies by shorting its film on the exchange. Around the same time, Cantor Fitzgerald revived its plans for a real-life HSX and tried to get regulatory approval for it.

Before any actual listings or exchanges could be made, a group of film studios, which was led by Motion Picture Association of America, asked the regulatory authorities to ban the practice, stating "that box office futures would be easily manipulated and of no use to the big film companies." The main concern was that decisions that could dramatically change the performance of any given movie at the box office — such as the weekend in which it premieres or the number of theaters in which it runs — could easily be changed on the fly by studios in order to manipulate the outcome.

Despite initially obtaining approval from the U.S. Commodity Futures Trading Commission (CFTC), in July 2010, the U.S. Senate passed financial-regulatory legislation which included a provision banning the proposed practice. Lobbying by the film industry and anxiety caused by the 2008 financial crisis are seen as the main factors behind the decision to ban box office futures.

Iowa Electronic Markets, a group of real-money prediction markets/futures markets operated by the University of Iowa sometimes trade in future stock dependent on the box office performance of Hollywood films. It can do so because it is granted a no-action letter by the CFTC due to its academic focus and the small sums that are involved, with the markets being run for educational and research purposes.

== See also ==
- Box Office Pro
- Option (filmmaking)
