= VaultML =

Israeli artificial intelligence company

Vault AI is an Israeli–based artificial intelligence company that claims to have created technologies that can "read" movie and TV screenplays in order to predict box office and investment performance. Part of the process reportedly entails analyzing 300,000 to 400,000 elements from the script, which could be anything from plot, character development, script structure, scene events. The founders are made up of high frequency trading veterans and state they use similar approaches to predicting film performance. Vault published its 2015 film predictions for over 20 movies in early 2015 and successfully predicted correctly many box office performances throughout that year.
