= Loch Ossian =

Freshwater lake in Highlands, Scotland

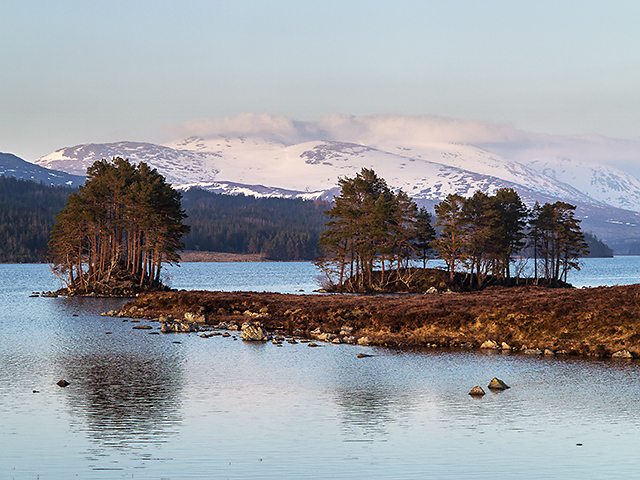
- Loch Ossian in the morning sun

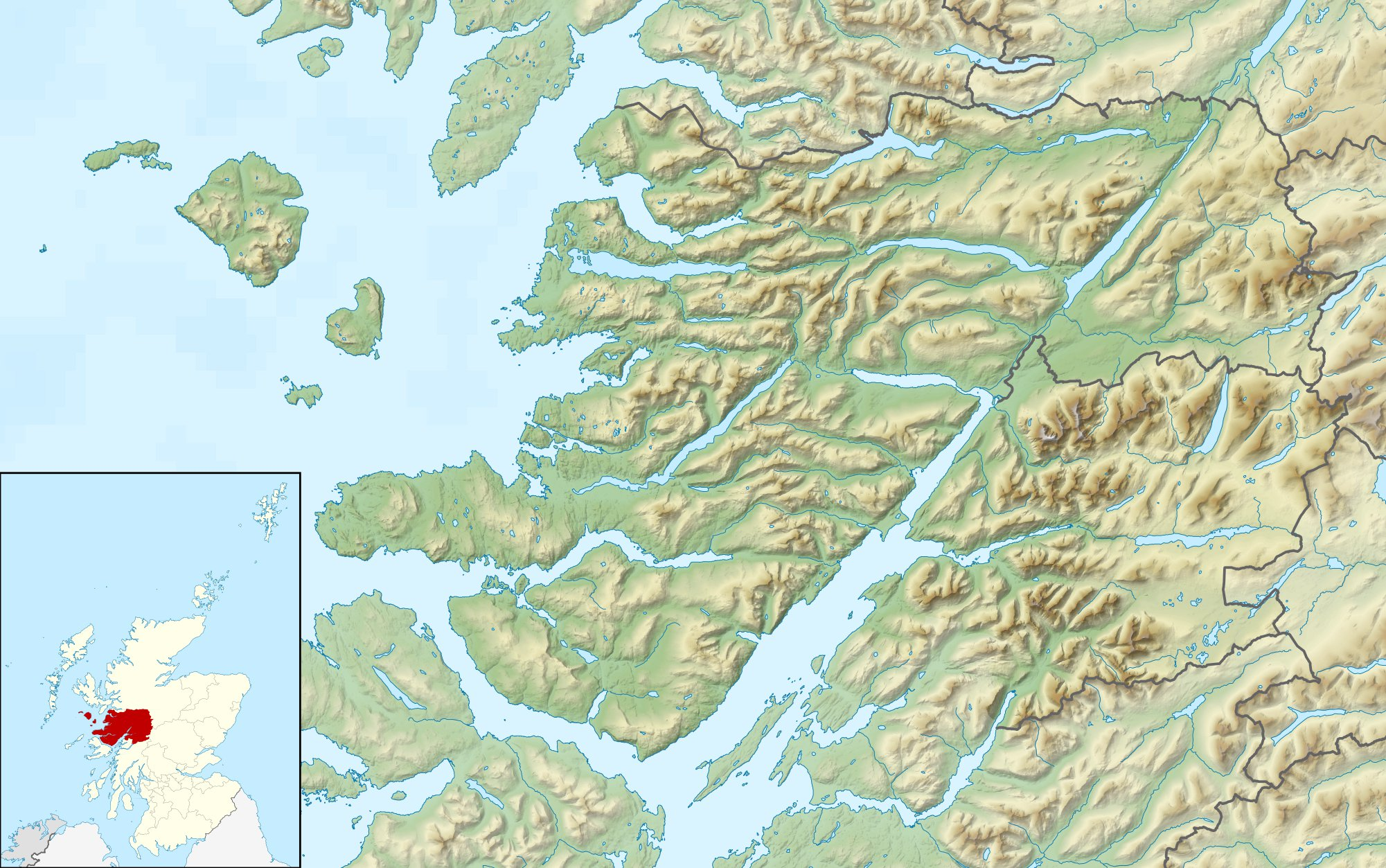
- Location in Lochaber
- Location: NN39146816
- Coordinates: 56.7792°N 4.6239°W
- Type: freshwater loch
- Max. length: 4.98 km (3.09 mi)
- Max. width: 0.5 km (0.31 mi)
- Surface area: 255 ha (630 acres)
- Average depth: 42.6 ft (13.0 m)
- Max. depth: 131.8 ft (40.2 m)
- Water volume: 1,171,086,119 ft^{3} (33,161,466.0 m^{3})
- Shore length^{1}: 13 km (8.1 mi)
- Surface elevation: 385 m (1,263 ft)
- Max. temperature: 44.3 °F (6.8 °C)
- Min. temperature: 43.4 °F (6.3 °C)
- ^{1} Shore length is not a well-defined measure.

Loch Ossian (Scottish Gaelic: "Loch Oisein") is a narrow loch that is about 5 kilometres (3.1 mi) long on the north eastern edge of Rannoch Moor, on The Corrour Estate, with its western corner 2 kilometres (1.2 mi) east of Corrour railway station. It is drained by the River Ossian, flowing north into Loch Guilbinn and ultimately to the River Spean at Moy.

Loch Ossian is remote from public roads, and the nearest access is from Corrour railway station. On its banks near the western end of the loch stands Loch Ossian youth hostel, which belongs to the Scottish Youth Hostels Association (SYHA). The hostel was recently restored as an 'eco-hostel', boasting wind and solar power, and grey water and dry toilet systems. At the eastern end of the loch is Corrour Lodge.

In 1892, Sir John Stirling Maxwell began a programme of afforestation around Loch Ossian, planting a wide range of conifer species as well as beech, oak, sycamore and other broadleaves, leading to the creation of 320 hectares of woodland extending 5.5 kilometres along the north-west shores of the loch. Between 2000 and 2002, the conservationist Roy Dennis worked with the landowners Donald and Margo Maxwell MacDonald on a project to introduce red squirrels to the woodland, but Scottish Natural Heritage refused to issue the necessary licence. In 2017, Becky Priestley began a programme of red squirrel releases at Corrour.
