= Reindeerspotting: Escape from Santaland =

- Directed by: Joonas Neuvonen
- Written by: Joonas Neuvonen; Sadri Cetinkaya
- Screenplay by: Joonas Neuvonen
- Produced by: Jesse Fryckman; Oskari Huttu
- Starring: Jani Raappana
- Narrated by: Jani Raappana
- Edited by: Sadri Cetinkaya
- Music by: Various artists
- Distributed by: Bronson Club
- Release date: 9 April 2010
- Running time: 84 minutes
- Country: Finland
- Language: Finnish
- Budget: €149,979
- Box office: US$654,990 (Finland)

Reindeerspotting: Escape from Santaland (Finnish: Reindeerspotting: pako Joulumaasta) is a Finnish documentary film about drug abusers in Rovaniemi, Finland. It was directed by Joonas Neuvonen and produced by Jesse Fryckman and Oskari Huttu. The first screening of the film was in Tampere, in April 2010. The film was shown outside of Finland for the first time at the Locarno International Film Festival.

The name of the movie is a direct allusion to the 1996 British drama film Trainspotting, which treated the same theme from a Scottish point of view.

== Synopsis ==
The documentary follows several young drug abusers, but focuses on Jani Raappana. Jani is a drug addict, whose drug of choice is Subutex taken intravenously. He is unemployed and finances his addiction through thefts, burglaries, and welfare payments. He deems carjacking and theft of radios as something he "specialises in", and uses it as a way to get fast money. He faces conflicts with fellow drug users, and loses two fingers in an accident. Due to the shortage of Subutex in Rovaniemi, Jani starts to experience withdrawal symptoms, and suffers from the lack of substances available.

Jani is arrested after a failed burglary attempt, but remains silent during questioning and is released three days later. The court seeks to imprison him for at least a year for various offences such as DUI and theft, but for Jani prison seems like nothing special, just free food and accommodation. As his prison sentence draws closer, Jani accumulates debt due to his prolonged drug use. He manages to steal €5,000 from a grocery store and decides to flee Finland.

Jani visits various cities in Europe, such as Paris, London and Rome. He manages to source Subutex, but attempts to quit using drugs. He is successful until he reaches Spain, where he manages to find and inject heroin. Eventually dealers threaten to demolish his flat, and he finds himself in debt again. After running out of money, Jani returns home and is arrested two weeks later. The film states he spent time in and out of prison for "years." The film ends with Jani picturing himself living an ideal life, with a cottage and a wife.

== Aftermath ==
The main character in the movie, Jani Raappana, travelled to Cambodia with the film's director, Joonas Neuvonen, in May 2010. Raappana, who was born in 1983, died in Phnom Penh on 7 July 2010. Local media reported that Raappana hanged himself.

In January 2013, Neuvonen was sentenced to two-and-a-half years in prison for drug crimes.

A sequel to the film, titled Lost Boys was released on 25 September 2020. Directed by Neuvonen, the film details the aftermath of the premiere of Reindeerspotting and the death of Raappana in Cambodia.
