= Dixe Wills =

Author and journalist

Dixe Wills is an author and journalist, mostly writing green travel pieces for The Guardian. His previous books are The Z-Z of Great Britain, Places to Hide in England, Scotland and Wales, New World Order, and The Armchair Naturalist (as Johnson P. Johnson), all published by Icon Books.

In April 2010 his addition to the Cool Camping series, Tiny Campsites, was published by Punk Publishing. The book features 75 campsites across England, Scotland and Wales, all of an acre in size or under. Wills has said: "A small campsite will always triumph over a large one in the same way that a cosy boutique will ever prevail over a warehouse-like chain store. It's a matter of soul." His book Tiny Stations was the inspiration for the 2016 travel documentary series Paul Merton's Secret Stations.

Bibliography

- The Z-Z of Britain, 2005
- Places to Hide, 2006
- New World Order, 2007
- The Armchair Naturalist (as Johnson P. Johnson), 2007
- Tiny Campsites, 2010
- Fifty Walks in Sussex and the South Downs (with Nick Channer), 2013
- Fifty Walks in Brecon Beacons and South Wales (with Tom Hutton), 2013
- Tiny Islands, 2013
- Tiny Stations, 2014
- At Night, 2015
- Tiny Churches, 2016
- Tiny Histories, 2017
- Tiny Britain, 2018
- Tiny Castles, 2019
- The Wisdom of Nature, 2019
- The Ultimate Bucket List, 2020
