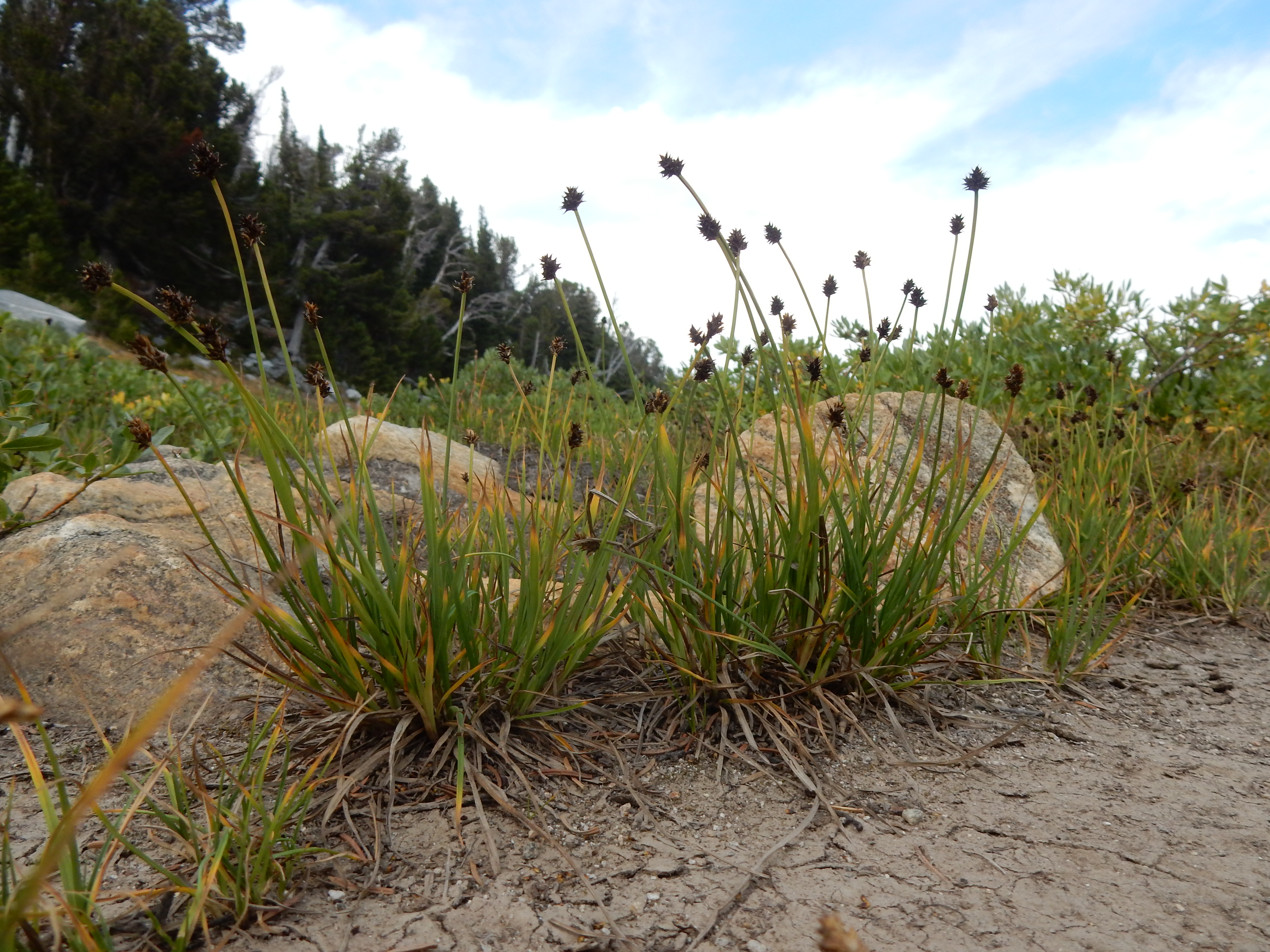
- In Montana

Conservation status
- Least Concern (IUCN 3.1)

Scientific classification
- Kingdom: Plantae
- Clade: Tracheophytes
- Clade: Angiosperms
- Clade: Monocots
- Clade: Commelinids
- Order: Poales
- Family: Cyperaceae
- Genus: Carex
- Species: C. lachenalii

Binomial name
- Carex lachenalii Schkuhr

Synonyms
- List: Carex bipartita var. austromontana F.J.Herm.; Carex bipartita var. scaber (Akiyama) Akiyama; Carex cooptanda C.B.Clarke; Carex lagopina Wahlenb.; Carex lagopina var. scaber Akiyama; Carex lagopina var. subtenuiflora Almq.; Carex parkeri Petrie; Carex parviflora Gaudin; Carex sewellii A.Benn. & C.B.Clarke; Carex tripartita All.; Vignea lachenalii (Schkuhr) Soják; Vignea lagopina (Wahlenb.) Rchb.; Vignea tripartita (All.) Rchb.

= Carex lachenalii =

Species of flowering plant

Carex lachenalii, called the twotipped sedge and hare's foot sedge, is a species of flowering plant in the genus Carex, native to temperate and subarctic North America, Greenland, Iceland, Europe, and Asia, and the South Island of New Zealand. Its diploid chromosome number is 2n=64, with some uncertainty.

== Subtaxa ==
The following subspecies are currently accepted:

- Carex lachenalii subsp. lachenalii – Northern Hemisphere
- Carex lachenalii subsp. parkeri (Petrie) Toivonen – New Zealand
