= Corrour railway station =

Railway station in the Scottish Highlands

Corrour Scottish Gaelic: An Coire Odhar
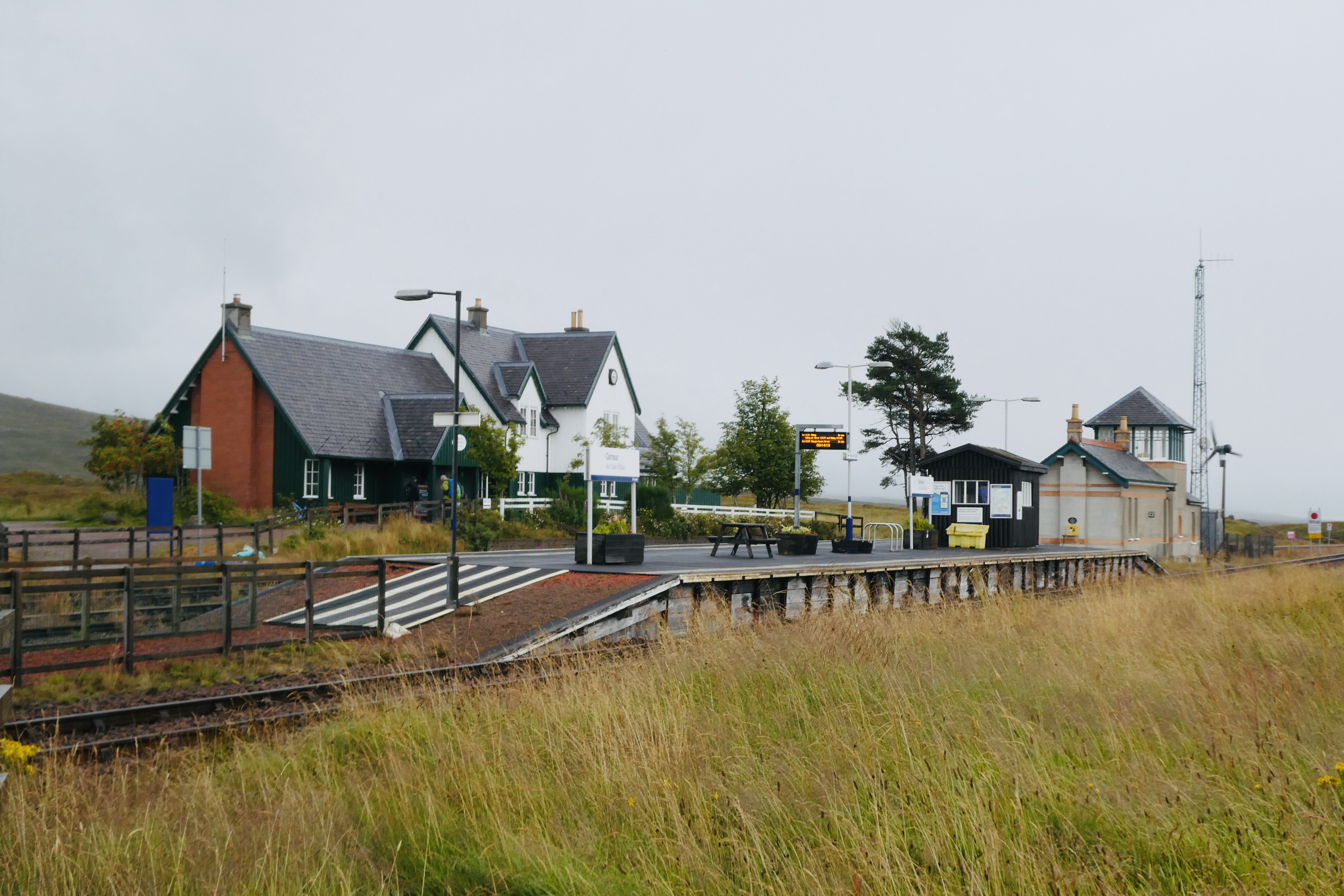
- Corrour station, looking southeast

General information
- Location: Loch Ossian, Highland; Scotland
- Coordinates: 56.7602°N 4.6907°W
- Grid reference: NN356663
- Manager: ScotRail
- Platforms: 2 (1 in regular use)

Other information
- Station code: CRR

History
- Original company: West Highland Railway
- Pre-grouping: North British Railway
- Post-grouping: LNER

Key dates
- 7 August 1894: Opened

Passengers
- 2021/22: ▲11,518
- 2022/23: ▲14,108
- 2023/24: ▲17,930
- 2024/25: ▲20,500
- 2025/26: ▲21,942
Location
Notes
- Passenger statistics from the Office of Rail and Road

Corrour railway station (/kəˈraʊər/ kər-OUR) is on the West Highland Line, near Loch Ossian on the Corrour Estate, in the Highland council area (formerly Inverness-shire) of Scotland. It is the highest mainline railway station in the United Kingdom at an elevation of 1,340 feet (410 m) above sea level. It is between Rannoch and Tulloch, 71 miles 54 chains (115.3 km) from Craigendoran Junction, near Helensburgh. ScotRail manage the station and provide most services, along with Caledonian Sleeper.

== History ==
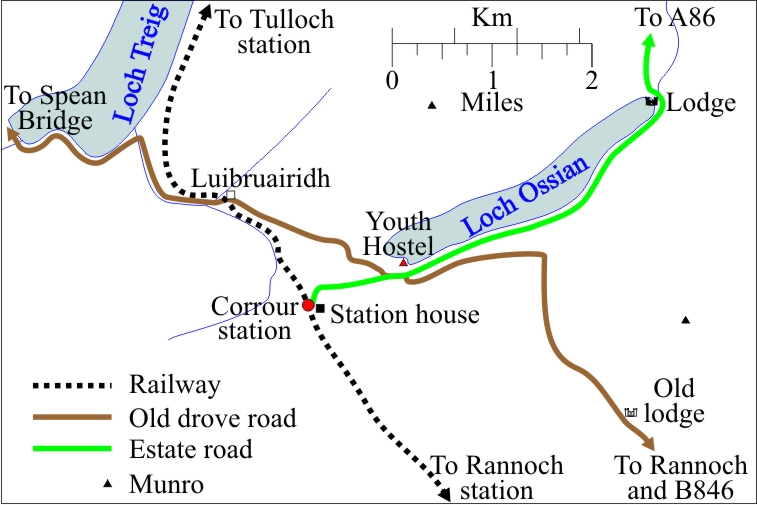
Map showing location of Corrour railway station with reference to other geographical features mentioned in the article

Corrour station was built by the West Highland Railway between 1893 and 1894 on its line linking Glasgow with Fort William, and was operated from its opening on 7 August 1894 by the North British Railway. It has a passing loop around an island platform. In common with the line's two other remote passing places, Gorton and Glen Douglas, it was built with a tall signalbox and an adjacent low building in which the signalman lived. The adjacent low building (in Corrour's case) was also used as a sub post office from 15 December 1896 and a Post Office telegraph office from 16 August 1898; Corrour even qualified as a post town. Later, the railway constructed a station house for the signalman on the east side of the tracks, and the original building became purely office accommodation for the railway and the post office.

Corrour was originally intended to be merely a passing place on the long section between Rannoch and Tulloch, called Luibruaridh (sic) after the nearest habitation, Luibruairidh, on the old drove road between Rannoch and Spean Bridge, about 1 1/2 miles (2.4 km) northwest of the passing place. However, from its opening, its small island platform was used as a station, and the name Corrour was also used although Corrour Lodge at that time was where the drove road crossed Coire Odhar, some 5 miles (8 km) southeast of the station (marked Corrour Old Lodge on the OS map). However, when the station opened, estate traffic was facilitated by the building of a mile-long (1.6 km) track connecting the station to the old drove road as it passed near the head of Loch Ossian.

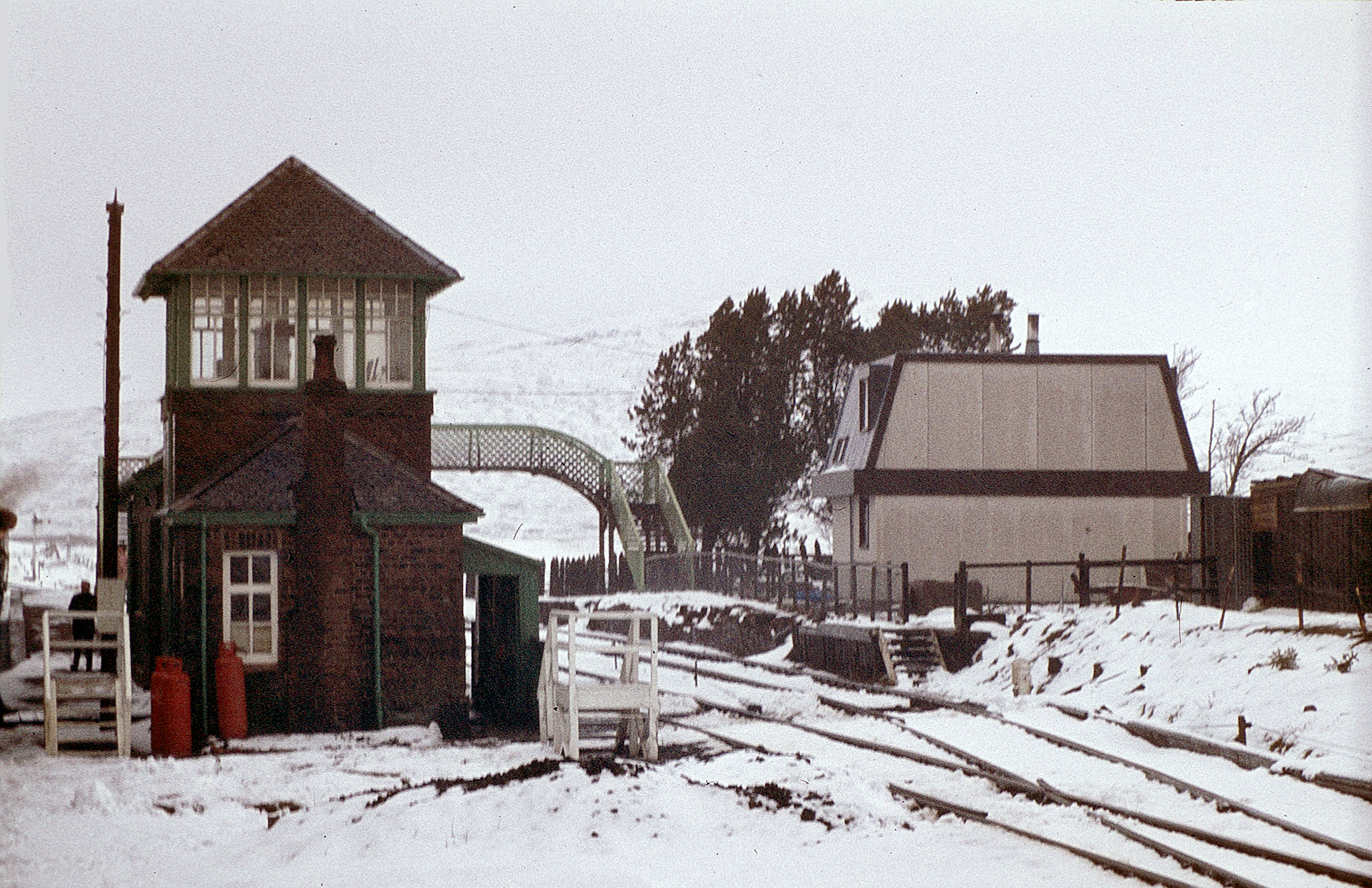
Corrour station from the south in March 1982, showing the original station house and footbridge

In the early days, there was so much estate business that the railway employed an extra clerk during the grouse season. It was theoretically a private station for the use of the estate, but it was also used by the public from the start, despite its not appearing in public timetables until September 1934.

In 1897, the estate built a new lodge at the foot of Loch Ossian, 4 1/2 miles (7.2 km) northeast of the station. There was, however, no vehicular access to the lodge from the public road system, so all goods (including vehicles) had to come and go by rail via Corrour station. Until the track along the south shore of Loch Ossian was built, the estate ran a small steamer from the lodge to the head of Loch Ossian (where Loch Ossian youth hostel is now), from which the station was only a little over a mile (1.6 km) away. In 1972, the Forestry Commission built a private macadamized road from the A86 near Moy Lodge to Corrour Lodge, so for the first time there was vehicular access to the station, via Corrour Lodge and Moy Lodge; a total distance of 15 miles (24 km).

=== 20th century onwards ===
During the construction of the Lochaber hydroelectric scheme in the 1930s, a small halt was located at Fersit, between Corrour and Tulloch, about 2 miles (3.2 km) short of the latter. This operated between 1 August 1931 and 31 December 1934.

Corrour sub post and telegraph office closed on 5 March 1977.

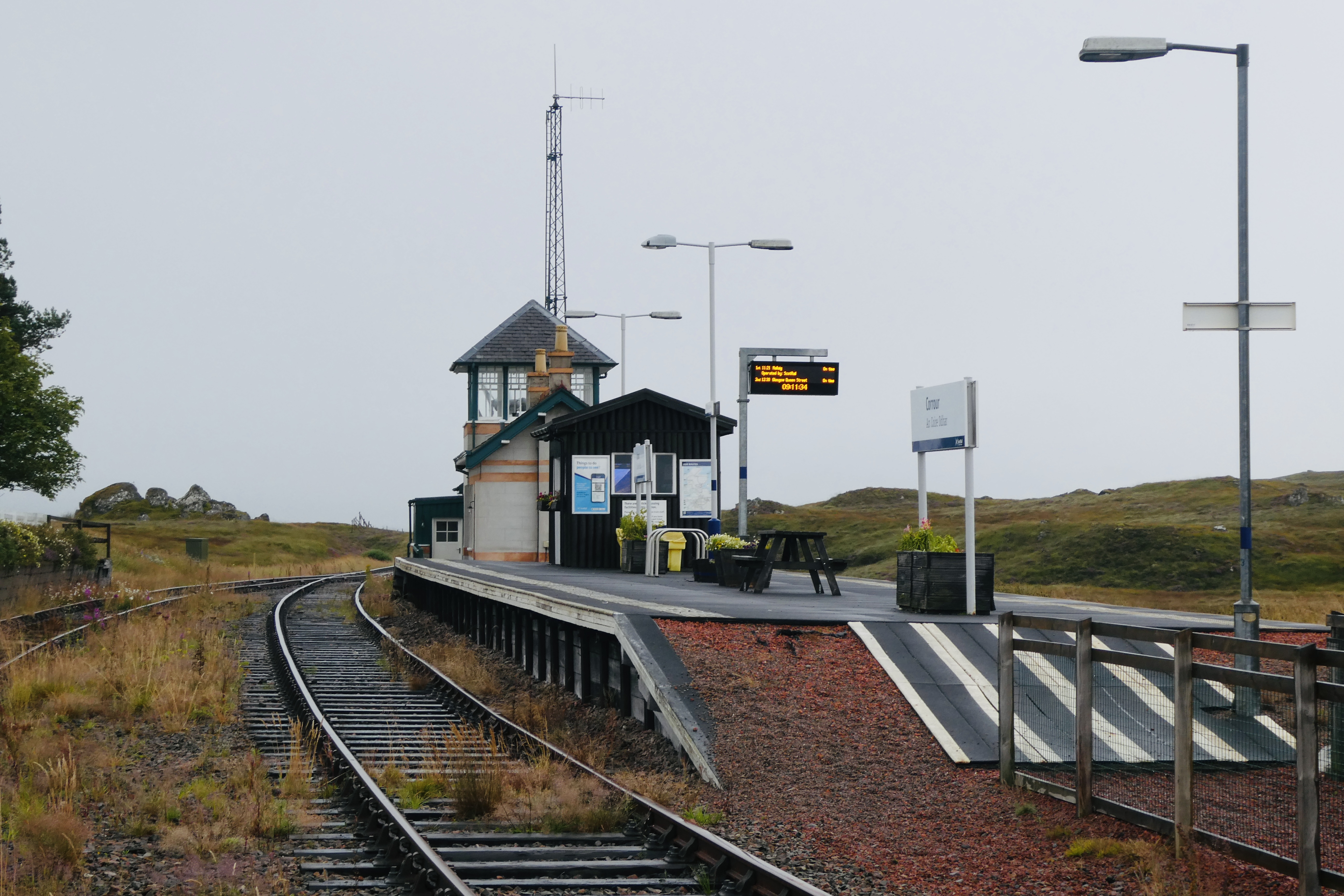
The little-used (since 1985) platform at Corrour; the old signal box can be seen immediately beyond the platform.

Since November 1985, all passenger trains have used the original "down" platform. The "up" loop remains, and is in situ, but it is no longer used by passenger trains. There was originally a footbridge at Corrour station, providing an exit to the east side, but it was moved to Rannoch station, following the downgrading of the "up" loop at Corrour. Passengers now cross the line by a barrow crossing.

In 1998/1999, Corrour Estate replaced the former signalman's house with a new station house. This included business premises and lodging for their managers, and had electric power from a diesel generator. The station house subsequently had a number of tenants over the years, becoming an independent hostel, an SYHA hostel (in addition to the SYHA’s nearby hostel at Loch Ossian), and a restaurant. In 2015, the estate took over the running of the building, and after closure for refurbishment, reopened it as a bar and restaurant. Most staff are students employed seasonally, and live on site.

In 2012, the red stone chippings on the platform, which Network Rail acknowledged would be hazardous to wheelchair passengers, were replaced by a hard surface.

In 2013, Historic Scotland listed the disused signalbox (called the "old watchtower" by Network Rail) and the adjacent building as Category C (the tall boxes at Gorton and Glen Douglas had been demolished). Subsequently, Network Rail, in conjunction with the Corrour Estate and the Railway Heritage Trust, refurbished the signalbox, and in 2016, the estate opened three guest rooms in it.

== Location ==
The station is one of the most remote in the United Kingdom, at an isolated location on the northern edge of Rannoch Moor. It is not accessible by any public roads. The nearest road, the B846 road from Loch Rannoch to Rannoch station, is a ten-mile (16 km) walk away by hill track, although Rannoch station itself is only 7 1/4 route-miles (11.5 km) away by rail. Vehicular access is by a 15-mile (24 km) private road from a little west of Moy Lodge on the A86. Until the late 1980s, the only electrical power at the station was provided by batteries. The only telephone was the railway's system which linked Corrour only to the adjacent signal boxes at Rannoch and Tulloch, which were on the public telephone system.

At 1,340 ft (410 m) above sea level the station provides a starting point for hill-walkers and Munro-baggers. There is accommodation and a bar/restaurant available at the station and an SYHA youth hostel just over a mile (1.6 km) away at the head of Loch Ossian.

== Facilities ==
Corrour is unstaffed and there are no ticket-issuing facilities. There are no departure announcements but there is WiFi, a telephone help point, an electronic departure display and a Caledonian Sleeper digital information point. There is a shelter with bench seats and cycle racks. The station is lit by electric lights.

== Passenger volume ==
Its estimated usage of 14,344 (2018–2019) made it the busiest station on the line north of Crianlarich, apart from Fort William and Mallaig.

Passenger Volume at Corrour

Year	Usage
2004–05	10,817
2005–06	9,885
2006–07	11,045
2007–08	13,226
2008–09	12,724
2009–10	12,280
2010–11	12,782
2011–12	12,222
2012–13	12,058
2013–14	13,138
2014–15	12,856

Year	Usage
2015–16	11,156
2016–17	11,092
2017–18	13,302
2018–19	14,344
2019–20	12,630
2020–21	2,268
2021–22	11,518
2022–23	14,108
2023–24	17,930
2024–25	20,500

The statistics cover twelve month periods that start in April.

== Services ==
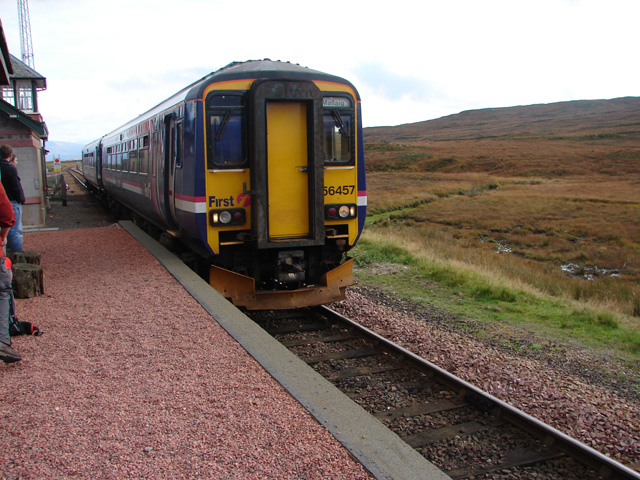
A First ScotRail train to Mallaig

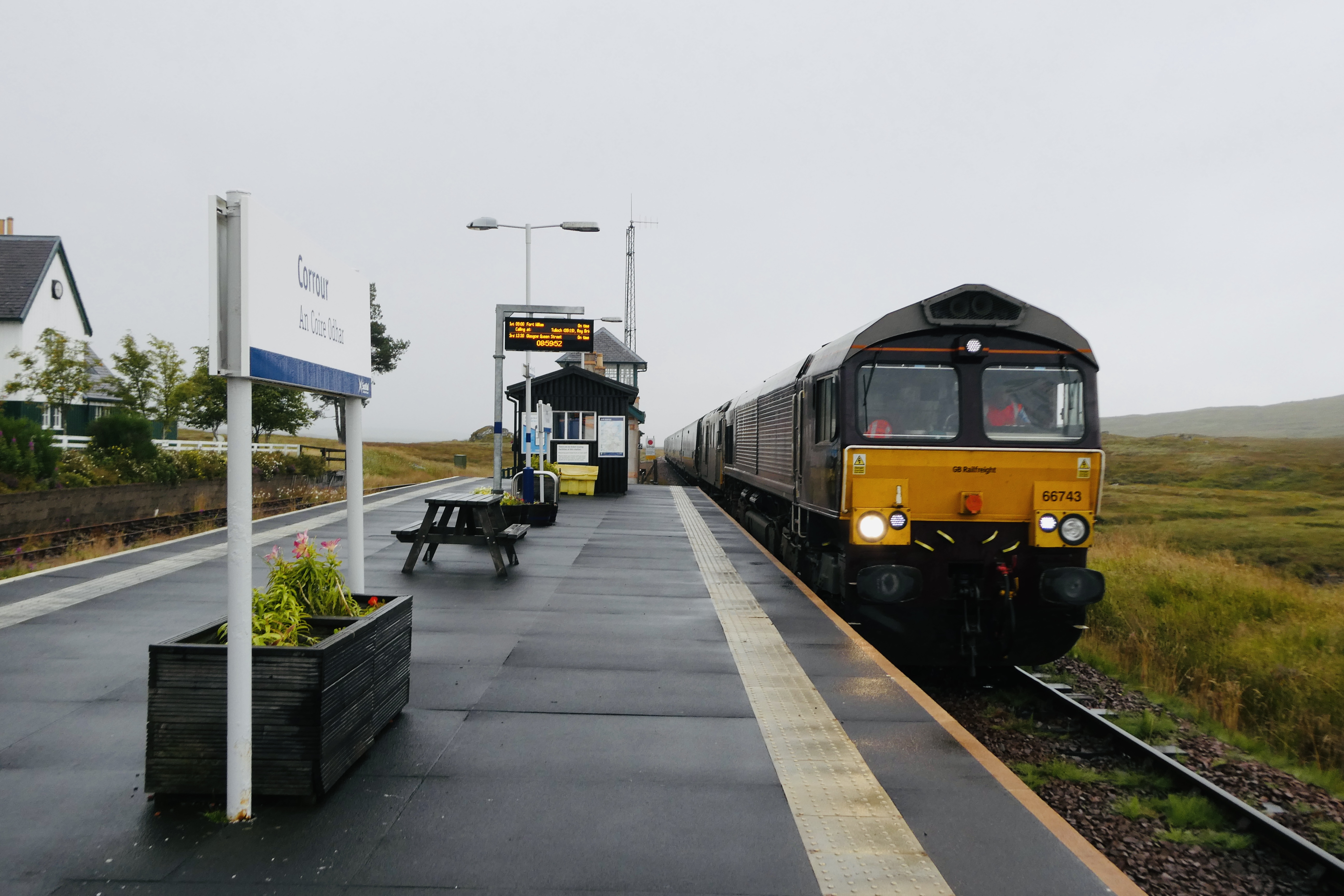
A Caledonian Sleeper train approaching Corrour, bound for Fort William

Corrour station is served by regular ScotRail passenger trains between Glasgow Queen Street and Fort William and Mallaig. These local services run three times a day in each direction on weekdays and Saturdays, but less frequently on Sundays (twice each way). In addition, Corrour is served by the Caledonian Sleeper service between Fort William and London Euston via Glasgow Queen Street (Low Level) and Edinburgh (these run daily except Saturday nights in each direction). The sleeper also conveys seated coaches and can therefore also be used by regular West Highland passengers travelling to or from Glasgow or Edinburgh.

Preceding station	National Rail	Following station
Rannoch	ScotRail; West Highland Line	Tulloch
Rannoch	Caledonian Sleeper (Highland Sleeper)	Tulloch
	Historical railways	
Rannoch	North British Railway; West Highland Railway	Tulloch

== Cultural references ==
The station, and the nearby mountain Leum Uilleim, gained fame when they were featured in a scene from the film Trainspotting. It also appeared in the fourth episode of the 2010 BBC series Secret Britain. It was also visited by Paul Merton in Episode 3 of his Channel 4 documentary series Paul Merton's Secret Stations.

== Bibliography ==
- Brailsford, Martyn, ed. (December 2017) [1987]. Railway Track Diagrams 1: Scotland & Isle of Man (6th ed.). Frome: Trackmaps. ISBN 978-0-9549866-9-8.
- Butt, R. V. J. (October 1995). The Directory of Railway Stations: details every public and private passenger station, halt, platform and stopping place, past and present (1st ed.). Sparkford: Patrick Stephens Ltd. ISBN 978-1-85260-508-7. OCLC 60251199. OL 11956311M.
- Jowett, Alan (March 1989). Jowett's Railway Atlas of Great Britain and Ireland: From Pre-Grouping to the Present Day (1st ed.). Sparkford: Patrick Stephens Ltd. ISBN 978-1-85260-086-0. OCLC 22311137.
- Jowett, Alan (2000). Jowett's Nationalised Railway Atlas (1st ed.). Penryn, Cornwall: Atlantic Transport Publishers. ISBN 978-0-906899-99-1. OCLC 228266687.
- Marshall, Geoff; Pipe, Vicki (2018). The Railway Adventures: Places, Trains, People and Stations. September Publishing. ISBN 978-1910463871.
- McGregor, John A., All Stations to Mallaig, D. Bradford Barton Ltd, 1st edition, 1982. ISBN 0-85153-426-0
- Mountain Moor and Loch: on the Route of the West Highland Railway, Sir Joseph Causton & Sons, 1st edition, 1894
- Thomas, John, The West Highland Railway, David St John Thomas, 3rd edition, 1992, ISBN 0-946537-22-4
- Yonge, John (May 1987). Gerald Jacobs (ed.). British Rail Track Diagrams - Book 1: ScotRail (1st ed.). Exeter: Quail Map Company. ISBN 0-9006-0948-6.
- Yonge, John (February 1993). Gerald Jacobs (ed.). Railway Track Diagrams - Book 1: Scotland and the Isle of Man (2nd ed.). Exeter: Quail Map Company. ISBN 0-9006-0995-8.
- Yonge, John (April 1996). Gerald Jacobs (ed.). Railway Track Diagrams - Book 1: Scotland and the Isle of Man (3rd ed.). Exeter: Quail Map Company. ISBN 1-8983-1919-7.
- Yonge, John (2007). Gerald Jacobs (ed.). Railway Track Diagrams - Book 1: Scotland & Isle of Man (Quail Track Plans) (fifth ed.). Bradford on Avon: Trackmaps (formerly Quail Map Co). ISBN 978-0-9549866-3-6. OCLC 79435248.
- Scotland: the Movie Location Guide – Trainspotting, Rannoch Moor Information on the station as it appears in "Trainspotting".
- Hidden Europe magazine – an article about Corrour from Hidden Europe magazine
- Article on the station by Ian Futers, four pages including track plan, photos, and description in Railway Modeller magazine for April 2008
