= Corrour Lodge =

Modernist residence in Scotland

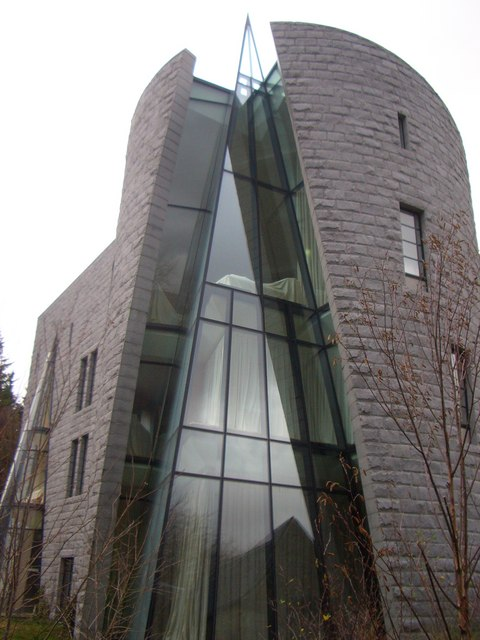
- Corrour Lodge in 2007
- Interactive map of the Corrour Lodge area

General information
- Architectural style: Modernist
- Location: Rannoch Moor, United Kingdom
- Coordinates: 56°47′31″N 4°36′3″W
- Opened: 2004
- Cost: £20 million

Technical details
- Material: Portuguese granite, steel and glass
- Grounds: 25 hectares

Design and construction
- Architect: Moshe Safdie

Website
- Official website

Inventory of Gardens and Designed Landscapes in Scotland
- Official name: Corrour Lodge
- Designated: 30 March 2003
- Reference no.: GDL00107

Corrour Lodge is situated at the eastern end of Loch Ossian on the Corrour Estate on Rannoch Moor, Scotland. It is a large modernist residence (also let as luxury holiday accommodation) which opened in 2004 in place of Old Corrour Lodge, which had been destroyed by fire in 1942. The previous lodge had been built in 1896 for John Stirling-Maxwell when he purchased the estate. Earlier still a building now referred to as Corrour Old Lodge had been the estate house and was some three miles to the south. The location is very remote – the entrance drive from the nearest public road is eleven miles long. However, Corrour railway station is only about four miles away.

== Corrour Estate ==
The vast Loch Treig Estates, of which Corrour was a part, were owned by the Macdonalds of Keppoch from the 14th century. In 1834, the Duke of Gordon sold the estates to John Walker of Crawfordton, who died in 1857, for £45,000. There was only 20 hectares (49 acres) of arable land. An 1842 account of Kilmonivaig parish, stated that "Perhaps there is no part of the Highlands where nature has done more, and landlords so little, for the benefits of the inhabitants as some parts of the parish".

Sir George Gustavus Walker inherited the estate in 1857 at a time when field sports were becoming more popular in the Scottish Highlands following a relaxation in the law. Walker converted Corrour Old Lodge to a shooting lodge but, despite the lodge's inaccessibility, the deer forest was relatively restricted at 5,883 hectares (14,540 acres) in 1883. However, with a decline in sheep farming, the deer forest was extended to 13,949 hectares (34,470 acres) by 1891 and grouse shooting and trout fishing were developed.

Stirling-Maxwell purchased the estate at this time and built a new lodge, the one now called Old Corrour Lodge, on a south-facing slope and at a lower elevation on the eastern shore of Loch Ossian. He undertook forestry planting, in particular attempting upland plantations. As well as planting Scots pine, he experimented with lodgepole pine, European and Japanese larch, and Sitka spruce, the last of which was a particular success. His influential work led to Stirling-Maxwell becoming chairman of the Forestry Commission from 1929 to 1932. World War II led to financial difficulty and most of the land was sold to the Forestry Commission in 1966 with sporting rights retained by the family. The Forestry Commission constructed an access track from the north east in 1972. Following a change in the law in 1981, the family bought back the land.

In 1995, the estate was sold (Note: At an asking price of over £3 million.) to Corrour Estate Company Ltd (Note: Registered in the Cayman Islands.) of which the beneficial owner was Lisbet Rausing. By 2003, after a number of company transfers, 99% was transferred to the Corrour Trust, whose trustees are Lisbet Rausing and Richard Oldfield. In 2011, the Estate extended to 26,000 hectares (65,000 acres). (Note: 260 km^{2}; 102 sq mi.)

== Corrour Old Lodge ==
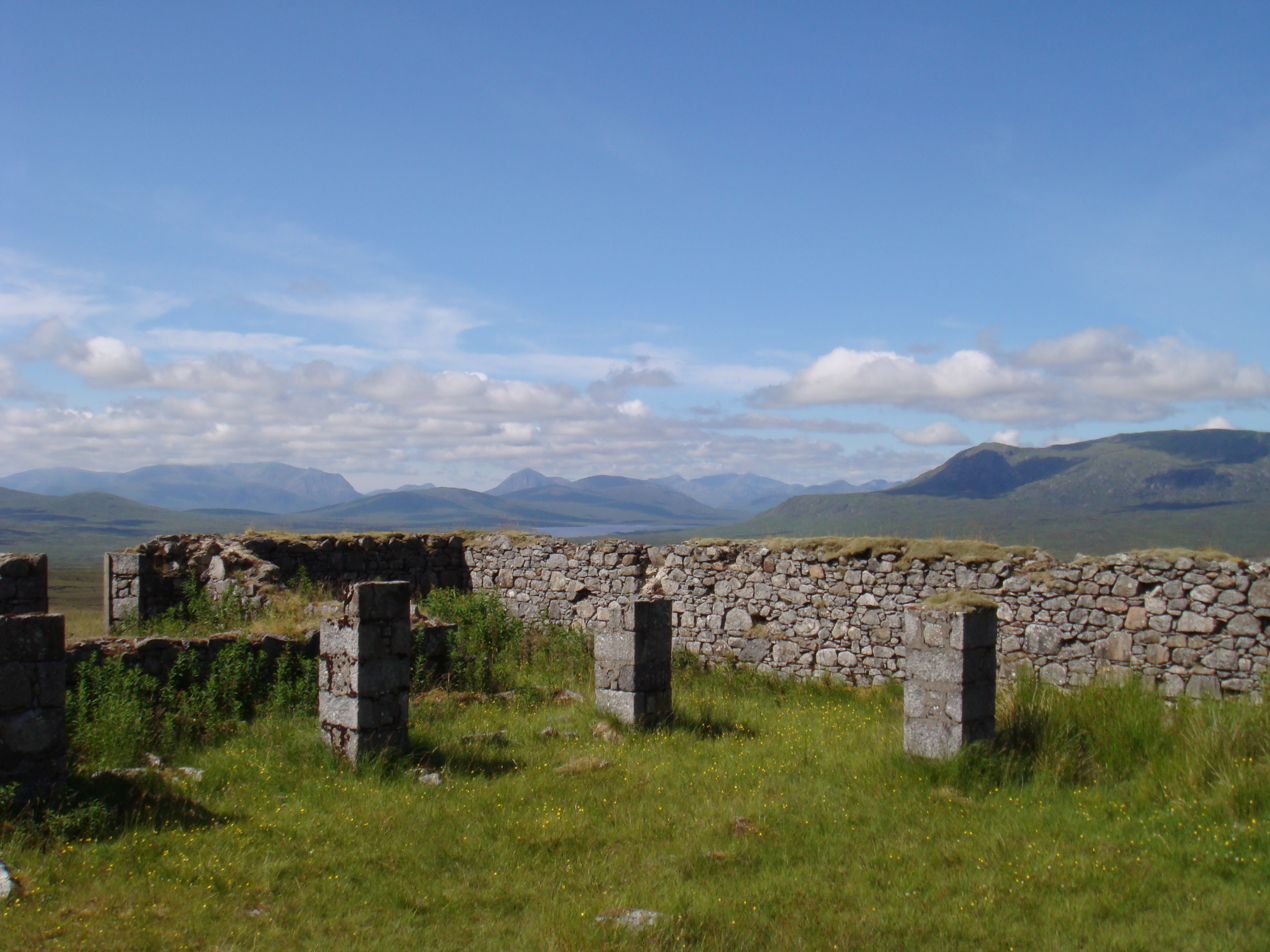
Corrour Old Lodge

George Gustavus Walker renovated Corrour Old Lodge (56°44′51″N 4°36′18″W) converting it to a shooting lodge, which at 525 metres (1,722 ft) was reputed to be the highest house in Scotland and one of the most inaccessible shooting lodges. It was beside the historical drove road, the Road to the Isles. 30 by 50 metres (98 by 164 ft) in size, it was set in Choire Odhair on the southwest flank of Càrn Dearg, 4.8 kilometres (3.0 mi) south of Loch Ossian. Now in a ruinous state after its roof had been deliberately removed in the 1930s, it was reputed to have been used as a sanatorium (isolation hospital) in the early 20th century.

== Old Corrour Lodge ==
The next Corrour Lodge (56°47′31″N 4°36′03″W), now called Old Corrour Lodge, was built in 1896 on the shore of Loch Ossian. The architect was Frank College of Wharrie and College, Glasgow and the garden, created in about 1904, was designed by L. and J. Falconer who made structural changes to the lodge at the same time. (Note: Photographs are available taken before its destruction.)

Originally, access was by the old drovers' Road to the Isles from Rannoch, but in 1894 the West Highland Line was opened across the estate. Stirling-Maxwell had agreed to the development on the proviso that Corrour railway station was built. He had a track built for pony and trap to travel the one mile (1.6 km) to Loch Ossian and constructed a boat house for his steam yacht Cailleach (Note: Cailleach is Gaelic for "Hag" or "Old Lady". A photograph is available.) to sail the three-mile (5 km) length of the loch to a jetty beside the lodge. In 1910 a drive was constructed along the south shore of the loch so visitors could have their cars transported by train and could then motor to their destination. (Note: Even in 2017 a direct sleeper service is available from London Euston to Corrour.) The boat house is now the SYHA Loch Ossian Youth Hostel.

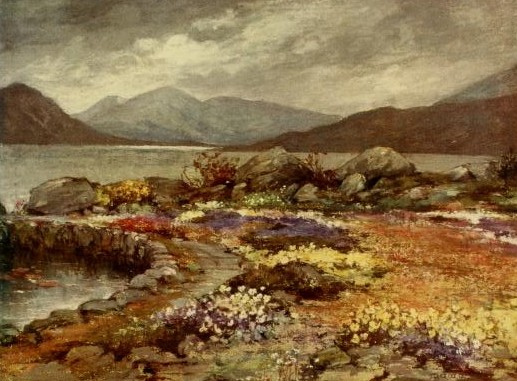
Garden at Corrour Lodge, 1908

The Stirling-Maxwells created a considerable garden – a sub-alpine garden, a wild garden beside the loch, a rhododendron garden a mile away on the south shore. Stirling-Maxwell used seeds and plants from the plant expeditions he sponsored to Himalaya, China and Frank Kingdon-Ward's expedition to Assam in 1935. Mountain pine and rhododendrons provided shelter.

The lodge was almost completely destroyed by fire in 1942 and Stirling-Maxwell wrote "the new house should be the sort of thing that William Adam might have built for Lord Huntly, then owner of Corrour ...". (Note: At the time it was thought Pollok House, Stirling-Maxwell's main house, was by Adam.) Instead it was replaced by a temporary wooden bungalow which remained until 1999.

== 21st-century Corrour Lodge ==
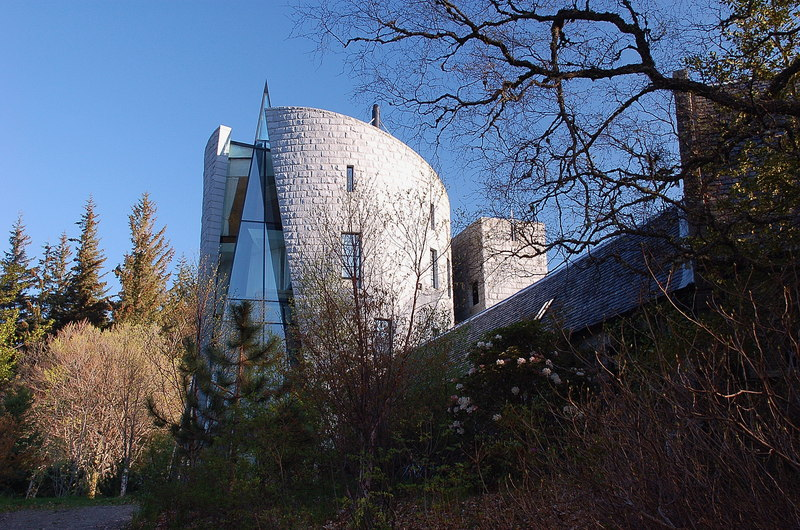
The new lodge, also showing part of the Edwardian structure.

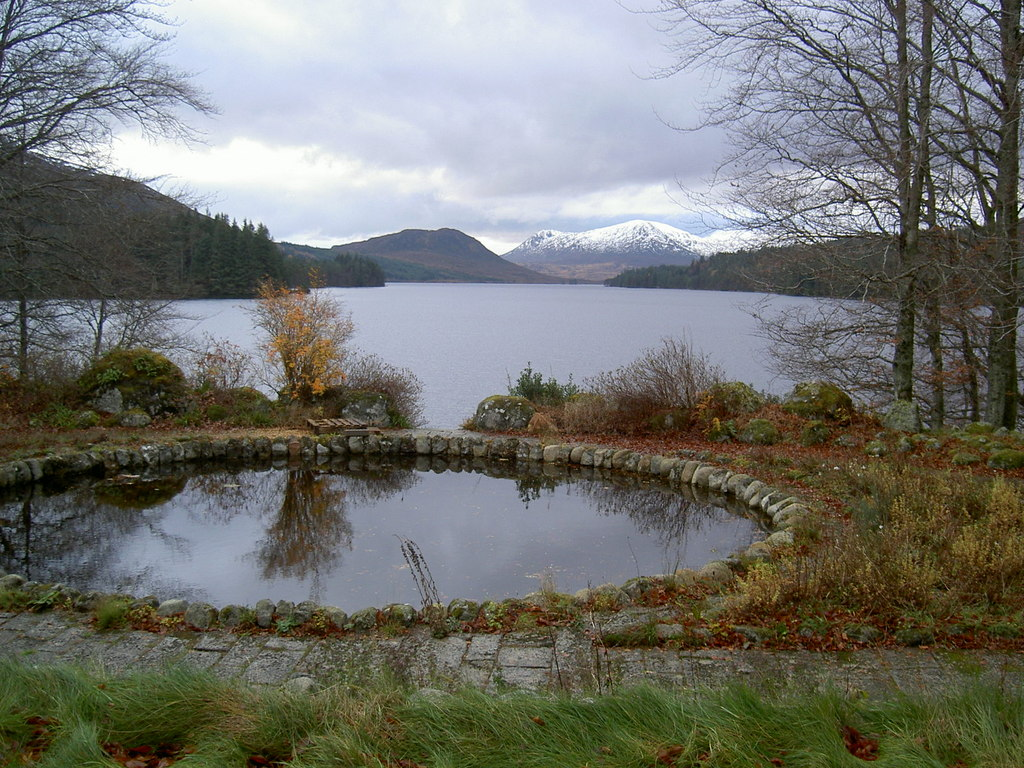
Lily pond beside terrace and loch

Corrour Lodge (56°47′31″N 4°36′03″W) was rebuilt during 1999 to 2003 on the same site as the previous lodge. The entrance drive, which leaves the A86 near the (south western) foot of Loch Laggan, is 11 miles (18 km) long. The lodge has been designed in a modernist style by Moshe Safdie and has been built of Portuguese granite, steel and glass at a reported cost of £20 million. The Great Hall is set between a cylindrical and a rectangular tower. To one side on the new building the old lodge's wings house the estate office (once the school house) and two cottages and on the other side is a detached cottage in what used to be the chapel. There is a detached timber sauna, turf-roofed and prefabricated in Norway.

The gardens have mostly been unaltered since they were laid out a century earlier, but since 2003 they have been listed in the Inventory of Gardens and Designed Landscapes in Scotland. They are of 25 hectares (62 acres), including the alpine garden of one hectare (2.5 acres), and the rhodedendron garden, to the south of Loch Ossian, is 25 hectares (62 acres).

When not being used by the owners and their guests, the lodge is let as serviced holiday accommodation. (Note: When let out as holiday accommodation the main lodge, with seven double suites and bunkroom for 14 children, has a weekly rental of £30,000, all inclusive.) There is further holiday accommodation in cottages around the estate as well as adjacent to the main lodge. In addition to being a retreat, the estate advertises itself as being available for activities such as deer stalking, fishing, walking, pony trekking and clay pigeon shooting. There have been allegations that helicopters and motor vehicles have been used unlawfully to drive deer towards people hunting. However, the estate management denies this has been done and says helicopters are only used to carry people to distant parts of the estate and to retrieve deer carcasses.
