= Monarch of the Glen cast =

Cast of TV comedy drama

The Monarch of the Glen cast is a list of actors who portrayed characters in the BBC Scotland comedy drama, Monarch of the Glen. The show began in 2000 with Alastair Mackenzie as the lead character portraying Archie MacDonald, a young restaurateur who returns to his Highland home of Glenbogle to discover that he is the new Laird. Along with Mackenzie, television veterans Richard Briers and Susan Hampshire received star billing as Archie's eccentric parents, Hector and Molly. Lorraine Pilkington portrayed Archie's love interest, Katrina, who was the only other actor to receive star billing in season one. In season two, Dawn Steele, Alexander Morton and Hamish Clark were bumped up to star status having been supporting regulars in the first season. Briers and Pilkington left the show in season three, prompting Julian Fellowes to receive star billing having appeared as recurring guest in seasons one to four. In season five, Fellowes and Mackenzie left the show, with Lloyd Owen filling the void as Archie's estranged half-brother, Paul. Season six saw a big change in the cast with Steele and Clark leaving and season five regulars, Rae Hendrie and Martin Compston being promoted to star status. Simone Lahbib and Tom Baker also joined the series six cast as Paul's love interest and Hector's younger brother, respectively. Lahbib left the show the following season due to pregnancy and Kirsty Mitchell was brought in as Paul's new love interest. Kellyanne Farquhar was the final actor to gain star billing, joining the cast as Paul's wayward god-daughter. The show ended in 2005 with special guest appearances by Briers, Clark and Fellowes. Morton was the only cast member to appear in every episode, with Hampshire and Clark the only other two actors to appear in every season.

Key
- Only characters who appeared in three episodes or more are listed.
- Characters are ordered in each section by first appearance in the show.
- The Hogmanay Special in December 2003 is counted as a series five episode.
- A white cell (such as the one for the character Molly MacDonald) indicates the character was given a star status in the relevant season(s).
- A light grey cell (such as the one for the character Hector MacDonald in the Season 7 column) indicates that the character did not receive star billing that season(s).
- A dark grey cell (such as the one for the character Archie MacDonald in the season 6-7 column) indicates the character did not appear in the relevant season(s) at all.

Season status:
If a character has more than one season status in one cell, then the status appears in the following format: (season,status/season,status), for example: (1,s/2,r)

- (g) indicates that the character was a guest in the relevant season having appeared in just one or two episodes that relevant season.
- (r) indicates that the character was a regular in the relevant season (appearing in over 70% of the season), but did not have a star status.
- (e) indicates that the character is classed as neither a guest nor a regular having appeared in over 2 episodes and less than 75% of the episodes in that season.

Character	Season						
Character	Season 1 (2000)	Season 2 (2001)	Season 3 (2001–02)	Season 4 (2002)	Season 5 (2003)	Season 6 (2004)	Season 7 (2005)
== MacDonald family ==
Hector MacDonald	Richard Briers	Richard Briers	Richard Briers				Richard Briers (g)
Lexie MacDonald	Dawn Steele (r)	Dawn Steele (6,e)					
Molly MacDonald	Susan Hampshire (6, e)						
Archie MacDonald	Alastair Mackenzie (5, e)						
Lizzie MacDonald	Abigail Cruttenden (g)	Hilary Maclean (g)			Saskia Wickham (g)		
Paul Bowman-MacDonald				Lloyd Owen (g)	Lloyd Owen	Lloyd Owen	Lloyd Owen
Donald MacDonald						Tom Baker (7,e)	
== Glenbogle Estate staff ==
Golly MacKenzie	Alexander Morton (r)	Alexander Morton	Alexander Morton	Alexander Morton	Alexander Morton	Alexander Morton	Alexander Morton
Duncan McKay	Hamish Clark (r)	Hamish Clark (6,e)					Hamish Clark (g)
Fergal MacClure		Jason O'Mara (r)					
Stella Moon			Alexandra Gilbreath (r)				
Jess MacKenzie			Rae Hendrie (g)		Rae Hendrie (r)	Rae Hendrie	Rae Hendrie
Irene Stuart				Rebecca Lacey (r)			
Ewan Brodie					Martin Compston (e)	Martin Compston	Martin Compston
== Kilwillie House residents ==
Lord Kilwillie	Julian Fellowes (e)	Julian Fellowes (e)	Julian Fellowes (e)	Julian Fellowes (5,g)			Julian Fellowes (g)
Badger		George Carson ^{[A]}	George Carson ^{[A]}	Angus Lennie (e) ^{[B]}	Angus Lennie (e) ^{[B]}		
Lady Dorothy Trumpington-Bonnet					Richenda Carey (e)		
Hermione Trumpington-Bonnet					Hermione Gulliford (e)		
== Other Glenbogle residents ==
Katrina Finlay	Lorraine Pilkington (3,g)			Lorraine Pilkington (g)			
Maureen MacLean	Carole Cassidy (g)	Carole Cassidy (g)					
Liz Logan			Jenny Lee (g)	Jenny Lee (g)	Jenny Lee (g)		
PC Callum McLean			Gavin Mitchell (g)		Gavin Mitchell (g)	Gavin Mitchell (g)	
Andrew Booth				Paul Freeman (e)	Paul Freeman (e)		
Dougal					John Yule (g) ^{[C]}	John Yule (g) ^{[C]}	
Amanda McLeish					Sara Stewart (e)		
Isobel Anderson						Simone Lahbib	
Dr. Gordon McKendrick						Donald Douglas (g)	Donald Douglas (g)
Zoë						Kari Corbett (e)	Kari Corbett (e)
Meg Paterson						Karen Westwood (e)	
Cameron MacKenzie							Katelyn & Rhianna Duff (e) ^{[D]}
Iona McLean							Kirsty Mitchell
Frank							Antony Strachan (e)
Amy McDougal							Kellyanne Farquhar
== Miscellaneous ==
Justine	Anna Wilson-Jones (1,e/2,g)						
Lancelot Fleming	Simon Slater (g)	Simon Slater (g)					
Alan Smythe	Paul Goodwin (e)						
Lucy Ford						Lucy Akhurst (e)	
Chester Grant						Anthony Head (e)	

== Notes ==
^{A} A character called "Badger" appeared with no lines in seasons 2-3. The actor's name is George Carson, not Angus Lennie who portrayed the character in seasons 4-5. In season 5, it was mentioned that Lennie's character had the real name of Hamish, therefore the name 'Badger' may be a nickname for the butler at Kilwillie Castle and could mean that the character that appeared in seasons 2-3 is different from the character in seasons 4-5. George Carson's grandson, Creag Carson also had a role in Monarch of the Glen, but his scene was deleted before airing.
^{B} In season 5, Badger made one uncredited appearance with no lines.
^{C} In season 6, the character was credited as "Derek", despite being credited as "Dougal" in season 5 and being called Dougal by the characters in all three of his episodes through the show.
^{D} Often, minor child parts – in this case, Cameron – are played by twins to avoid overworking the children. Although the character appeared in five episodes, the character had no lines.
