= Hilton McRae =

Scottish actor (born 1949)

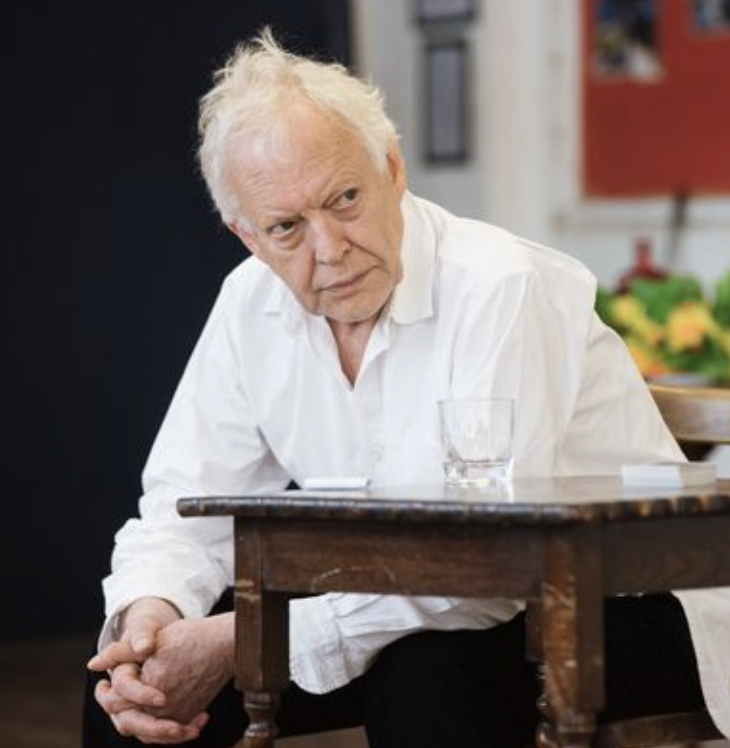
- Born: 28 December 1949 (age 76); Dundee, Scotland
- Occupation: Actor
- Years active: 1977–present
- Spouse: Lindsay Duncan
- Children: 1

Hilton McRae (born 28 December 1949) is a Scottish actor, working in theatre, television and film.

== Career ==
McRae was part of the radical theatre group 7:84 before graduating from the University of Edinburgh, and by 1977 he had joined the Royal Shakespeare Company. He has concentrated mainly on avant-garde and political theatre.

His most mainstream American film role was as the rebel star-pilot Arvel Crynyd (Green Leader) in Return of the Jedi; he was uncredited for his brief appearance. In the UK he had substantial roles in The French Lieutenant's Woman and Greystoke: The Legend of Tarzan.

He has performed in several musicals on the London stage, including Mamma Mia! and Miss Saigon, in which he played the part of The Engineer. He performed the role of Mr Stopnick in the UK premiere of Caroline, or Change at the National Theatre, which won the Best Musical Award from the London newspaper the Evening Standard. In 2008 he played the part of Scarecrow in the Southbank's production of The Wizard of Oz.

In 2006, he acted in Rabbit, a play by Nina Raine which opened at the Old Red Lion Theatre in London, and then transferred to the Trafalgar Studios, Whitehall.

McRae starred in the play The Kreutzer Sonata, based on Tolstoy's novella, which opened at the Gate Theatre in London in 2009 with McRae in the solo role. The play was revived for a second run in 2012. The production also later transferred to New York City. McRae's performance received acclaim both in the UK from many top publications, and in the U.S. from the New York Times.

== Personal life ==
McRae was born in Dundee. He is married to actress Lindsay Duncan, with whom he has a son, Cal McRae (born September 1991).

A close friend and University of Edinburgh classmate of Ian Charleson, McRae contributed a chapter to the 1990 book, For Ian Charleson: A Tribute.

== Filmography ==
=== Film ===
Year	Title	Role	Notes
1981	The French Lieutenant's Woman	Sam	
1983	Return of the Jedi	Green Leader	Uncredited
1984	Greystoke: The Legend of Tarzan, Lord of the Apes	Willy	
1989	King of the Wind	Cook	
1993	The Secret Rapture	Norman	
1995	Voices	Gerald Duffy	
1999	Mansfield Park	Mr. Price	
2011	The Power of Three	Gordon	
2012	National Theatre Live: Timon of Athens	Apemantus	
2014	Serena	Doctor	
2015	Far from the Madding Crowd	Jacob Smallbury	
2015	Macbeth	Macdonwald	
2016	Denial	Judge John Trench	
2017	The Sense of an Ending	Alex Stuart	
2017	Darkest Hour	Arthur Greenwood	
2018	A Private War	Adam Watkins	

=== Television ===
Year	Title	Role	Notes
1977	Maidens' Trip	Matthew	Episode: "Charity"
1978	Life at Stake	Bernard Lortie	Episode: "James Cross Will Be Executed"
1980	Play for Today	Singer / Ad-Man / Robert	3 episodes
1981	Astronauts		Episode: "One in Four Goes"
1981	If Winter Comes	Karoli	TV movie
1982	Dead Ernest	Mozart	Episode #1.6
1983	Gaskin	John Rossington	TV movie
1983	No Excuses	Pimm / Phin	4 episodes
1983	Nelly's Version	Vagrant	TV movie
1984	The Kit Curran Radio Show	Hooper	Episode: "The Big Break"
1985	Screen Two	Charlie Hendon	Episode: "Poppyland"
1985	A.D.	Azariah	Episode: "Part 2"
1985	Roll Over Beethoven	Griff	Episode #1.8
1985	Max Headroom: 20 Minutes into the Future	Breugel	TV movie
1988	Hannay	Lord Drysdale	Episode: "Act of Riot"
1989	Crossbow	Mercenary Leader	Episode: "The Lost City"
1989-1990	The Justice Game	Gerry Cowan	Main role
1993	Zorro	Narcisco	Episode: "The Reward"
1994; 1998	The Bill	Clive Bellman / Prosecution Barrister	2 episodes
1994	Shakespeare: The Animated Tales	Hortensio / Peter	Voice, Episode: "The Taming of the Shrew"
2001	Monarch of the Glen	Murdo	Episode: "Series 2 Episode 5"
2002; 2007	Holby City	Alan Simpson / Rob Snow	6 episodes
2003	Serious & Organised	John Sands	Episode: "Greed"
2003	Silent Witness	Supt. Colin Osbourne	Episode: "Beyond Guilt"
2004	Midsomer Murders	Mathew Spearman	Episode: "Bad Tidings"
2004	Murder City	Emerton Linex	Episode: "Nothing Sacred"
2004	Frances Tuesday	Feltham	TV movie
2008	Doctors	Dr. McCarthy	6 episodes
2009	The Execution of Gary Glitter	Gary Glitter	TV movie
2009	Lewis	Mack Maguire	Episode: "Counter Culture Blues"
2011	Zen	Gianni / Massimo Colonna	Episode: "Cabal"
2011	Injustice	PMO Adam Christie	3 episodes
2012	New Tricks	Frank McNair	Episode: "Glasgow UCOS"
2014	Playhouse Presents	Mr. Adams (voice)	Episode: "Foxtrot"
2016	Endeavour	The Great Zambezi	Episode: "Ride"
2019	Victoria	Combe	Episode: "A Coburg Quartet"
2019	Chernobyl	Milan Kadnikov	Episode: "Vichnaya Pamyat"
2020	The Third Day	Janny	3 episodes
2022	Halo	Regret (voice)	3 episodes
