= Falls of Pattack =

Coordinates: 56.96334°N 4.37489°W

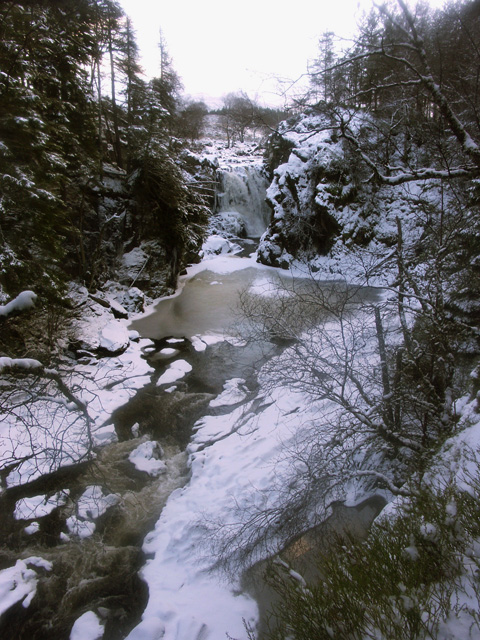
Falls of Pattack on a very cold December afternoon 2005

Falls of Pattack is a waterfall in the Scottish Highlands' Cairngorm National Park. The falls are on the River Pattack, about 2 km south of the A86 road between Kinloch Laggan and Feagour.

== See also ==
- Waterfalls of Scotland
