= River Pattack =

River in Scotland

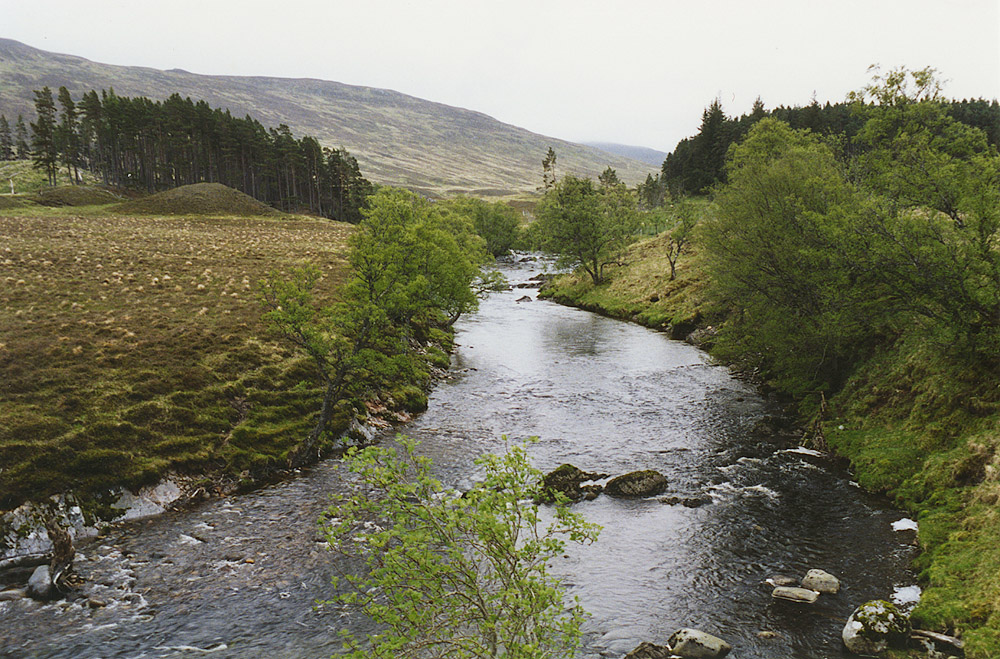
- River Pattack
- Etymology: Pot, jar; stream of pots
- Native name: Patag (Scottish Gaelic)

Location
- Country: Scotland
- Council area: Highlands

Physical characteristics
- Source
  - location: Loch Pattack
  - coordinates: 56.8859°N 4.3949°W
  - elevation: 420 metres (1,380 ft)
- Mouth
  - location: Kinloch Laggan
  - coordinates: 56.9741°N 4.4101°W
  - elevation: 260 metres (850 ft)
- Length: 9 miles (14 km)

Basin features
- Waterfalls: Falls of Pattack

River Pattack is a river in the Highlands of Scotland. The Pattack drains water northwards from Loch Pattack for 9 miles (14 km) towards Loch Laggan.

== Course ==
The river is fed from Loch Pattack, which is fed itself by several small watercourses; Allt Cam, Caochan Ban, Caochan Ruadh, and Alt a' Chaoil-Rèidhe. The river progresses northwards and flows over 12 sets of waterfalls, the most notable being the Falls of Pattack at 15 metres (49 ft) high. At Feagour, the river curves westwards with the A86 road on its right bank (facing downstream), it then feeds into the eastern end of Loch Laggan. Its course from loch to loch (Pattack to Laggan) takes it a distance of 9 miles (14 km).

There is a hydroelectric scheme on the river at NN548830 which was started in 2014. The plant generates enough electricity to power 5,000 homes, and one of the companies involved also improved path access to the waterfalls on the river. An upstream weir, about 1.8 kilometres (1.1 mi) south of the hydro plant was also constructed to provide a good head of water. The river is also known for its wild swimming locations such as those just downstream of the Falls of Pattack.

The name Pattack (which is Patag in Gaelic), derives from the word pots or jars; a similarly named stream near Turriff is named Putachi, meaning a stream of pot-like pools. A local rhyme about the river is Patag dhubh bhalgach an aghaidh uisge Alba (Scottish Gaelic for 'Dark, bubbly Patag, that flows against the streams of Alba'). This refers to its course northwards then westwards.

The river system is known to have brown trout using it, which needed consideration during the new weir and hydro construction. Brook lamprey, Atlantic salmon and minnows were also recorded in the river, but the salmon and minnow numbers were largely concentrated at the northern end of the river, with the many waterfalls and weirs proving to be obstacles for migratory fish.

=== Loch Pattock ===
Loch Pattock is described as an oligiotrophic lake, which lies at 424 metres (1,391 ft) above sea level, and the loch routinely holds over 308,200 cubic metres (10,880,000 cu ft) of water. The catchment area is 4,849 hectares (11,980 acres) and the loch has an average depth of 4.3 metres (14 ft), but at is deepest, it is 17.7 metres (58 ft).

== Popular culture ==
The river and a tributary feature in the film Mrs Brown, and a cottage alongside the river and one of the waterfalls featured in the BBC series Monarch of the Glen.
