= The Execution of Gary Glitter =

2009 British television drama film

- Written by: Rob Coldstream
- Directed by: Rob Coldstream
- Starring: Hilton McRae
- Music by: Sandy Nuttgens
- Country of origin: United Kingdom
- Original language: English

Production
- Producer: Rob Coldstream
- Cinematography: Paul Kirsop
- Editor: Mike Burton
- Running time: 90 minutes
- Production company: Juniper Communications Limited

Original release
- Network: Channel 4
- Release: 6 November 2009

The Execution of Gary Glitter is a 2009 British television drama, produced by Juniper Communications Ltd and broadcast on Channel 4 in the UK. Set in a parallel Britain, the film follows an imaginary trial and execution by hanging of former glam rock singer Gary Glitter, who has been convicted for possession of child pornography and rape of minors, for "offences against children". The programme was written, produced, and directed by Rob Coldstream, and was broadcast on 9 November 2009.

Though intended to open debate on hanging and capital punishment in the United Kingdom, the programme was poorly received and the choice of celebrity accused led to a complaint being registered with Ofcom by Glitter (which was later dismissed).

== Plot ==
Set in an imaginary Britain in which the death sentence has been reintroduced, the drama examines the possible outcomes of Glitter being the first to be put on trial under the imagined "Capital Crimes Act", which reintroduced hanging as a penalty for murder or rape of a child under 12. He is indicted shortly after its inception and his simultaneous extradition to the UK from Vietnam after serving three years there for sex offences. Glitter applies for entry to Hong Kong and Thailand, but is forced to return to the UK, where he is to be charged with child rape and to stand trial as a paedophile for "category one sex offences" committed whilst abroad.

Glitter meets his lawyer after returning and being arrested. He is informed of the possibility of either the case being dismissed or won due to the newness of the laws, and because the offences concerned were committed abroad. He is suddenly shocked into reality when he is informed of the change in UK laws, and that the ultimate sentence he could face is death. A history of the campaign to bring back capital punishment is shown from its inception in 2004, as well as interviews with the public and people in positions of responsibility and their attitudes towards capital punishment.

Glitter continuously proclaims his innocence; meanwhile, the public cry for justice and his death while the media rake through his previous charges and history of offences. His trial goes ahead after an appeal for dismissal is denied. The evidence of the alleged offences is shown, as well as Glitter's statements to the police, and witnesses give their evidence, including Glitter himself. Glitter is found guilty, and the debate over sentencing begins. Glitter is told there are no mitigating circumstances shown and he is sentenced to death; due to concerns over extreme waiting time on death row, the law requests his sentence be carried out within 30 days. Glitter maintains his innocence and files an appeal to the Home Secretary, which is dismissed shortly before the scheduled execution. Still convinced he will be released, while listening to a radio Glitter finds himself back in the charts just before he is executed, though the song turns out to be a mocking remix of one of his hit songs combined with a leaked recording of his own words from his trial speech, which includes him saying he isn't a monster, is no angel and mentioning having "the booze" and "the drugs". The remix also has samples of police car sirens and a voice claiming "You will be taken from this place". Glitter smashes the radio in anger as a result.

The film ends shortly after Glitter is hanged, shouting that he is an "innocent man" and that he "didn’t do anything" only for the trapdoor below the gallows to be released, having continued to protest his innocence right up until his death.

== Cast ==
All cast are shown in the order they appear in the credits:

- Hilton McRae as Gary Glitter
- Adam James as John Carter QC
- Clive Flint as DCI Crane
- Louisa Rix as Valerie Clark: Home Secretary
- Caroline O'Neill as Kelly Andrews
- Anna Nguyen as Girl A
- Terence Harvey as prosecution counsel
- Lai Thi Nhuyen as Mrs Tran
- David Caldwell-Evans as Dr Jones
- Malcolm Rennie as the judge
- Ann Widdecombe as herself, a politician
- Miranda Sawyer as herself, a journalist
- Garry Bushell as himself, a journalist

== Production ==
Rob Coldstream, the creator of the programme, wrote an account of the premise and production behind the drama which was published in The Independent in November 2009. He said that he had the idea for the programme after reading a report in a national newspaper that had said that "If Gary Glitter was to be strung up in Trafalgar Square tomorrow, nobody would turn a hair". Coldstream argued that "The time was right for a thought-provoking and compelling drama that would confront viewers with the consequences of the death penalty", after UK polls in June and September that year had shown more than 50% of Britons supported bringing back capital punishment.

During filming the actor playing Glitter (Hilton McRae) walked onto set and was hissed at and insulted when the crowd thought it was the real Glitter. Coldstream said that:

When we'd decided to make a film exploring how society deals with its most reviled offenders, we hadn't expected it to be an easy ride. But this was confirmation that we were tapping into a raw nerve [...] When we covertly filmed an actor outside the Old Bailey displaying a banner reading 'Honk for hanging', the cacophony of car horns was sobering. Then there was the time we approached members of the public to stand in as extras. 'Glitter? Executed? Should have done it years ago, mate. Count me in.' And we're not talking about hooligans with H.A.T.E tattooed on their foreheads, we're talking about business people, dinner ladies and door-to-door salesmen; in other words, us.

Coldstream said that "the idea was to force viewers to explore their own impulses – as individuals and communities – over how we deal with society's most reviled offenders in a way that was challenging and disturbing." He also felt that the programme was necessary to show "how easily individuals and communities adjust to the new morality once it has been sanctioned by authority." The hanging scene was filmed in a real UK condemned suite at the former Crumlin Road Gaol in Belfast, the gallows having last been used to hang a condemned prisoner in 1961.

== Reception ==
The programme was described by the Radio Times as "a strange, often repellent film". John Preston in The Daily Telegraph considered it to be "One of the most stupid dramas I have ever seen on television." Writing in November 2009, he continued: "Quite why the death penalty should have been reintroduced for sexual offences, especially those – as in Glitter's case – that were committed abroad was never, perhaps wisely, gone into." Charlie Brooker's Screenwipe Review of the Year 2009 harshly criticised the programme, remarking that it "constructed a complex moral maze from a serious issue, then drove a bus full of squawking clowns through the middle of it," and concluded, "That's certainly made me think – it's made me think, 'I don't know if I want a television any more'."

Kathryn Flett, writing in The Observer newspaper shortly after the broadcast, described it as a "deeply unsavoury docu-drama hybrid which [...] was not merely offensive – hell, I'm all for offensive – but offensively ill-conceived". She argued that the programme had let down any possibility of asking "proper grown-up questions about capital punishment" by electing to pick a particularly sensationalist subject. She felt that this led the producers to "fatally undermine the premise". Her attitude towards the acting was more positive, "plaudits however must go to Hilton McRae, whose doppelganger performance as Paul Gadd was brilliantly unnerving."

=== Ofcom complaint ===
Glitter (Paul Gadd) lodged a complaint with Ofcom about the show, alleging unfair treatment. The complaint was not upheld. Glitter claimed that "a reasonable viewer might have concluded that [he] had committed 'terrible crimes which have gone unpunished'" and stated that he "was never prosecuted in Vietnam for child rape." Channel 4 stated that the programme "was not sensationalist and was not intended to be forensic examination of Mr Gadd's sexual activities" and that "the programme did set out Mr Gadd's real life convictions, but did not suggest that the fictional Mr Gadd had committed or had been convicted of any crime but not punished for it." It also went on to say that "the fictional nature of the programme was emphasised by a number of factors [...] the blending of fact and fiction is not a new technique and that viewers were well used to engaging with the technique".

Ofcom initially upheld the complaint in its provisional decision. Channel 4 appealed for a review, which was carried out by the Broadcasting Review Committee (BRC). The BRC noted that Glitter had stated his position as unfairly being denied an opportunity to rebut the claim that he "was a child rapist"; however, they "did not consider that this was a fair interpretation" of Channel 4's intent, which "focused on the effect of the programme on viewer's perceptions of Mr Gadd." They also felt that no real allegations had been made against the "real Mr Gadd. As such, the committee did not consider that Channel 4 was obliged to give Mr Gadd an opportunity to respond." The BRC watched an excerpt of the programme and felt that DCI Crane was clearly a fictional character, and that the fictional charges of child rape were made by that clearly fictional character. They thus felt that any viewer would see the programme as a fictional one, and that "The Committee noted that further mention of the specific charge of child rape in the programme was always in a clearly fictional context. Consequently, viewers would not have come to the conclusion that Mr Gadd was guilty of more serious crimes which had gone unpunished."

The BRC felt that "In view of Mr Gadd's well-publicised reputation in relation to child sex offences, the Committee considered that there was likely to be little scope for additional damage to his reputation in relation to his sexual activities that would result in unfairness to him." and that they felt "the programme was a fictional drama and that it would have been clear to viewers that this was the case." They concluded by stating that "The Committee concluded that in these particular set of circumstances there was no unfairness to Mr Gadd in the programme as broadcast."

== See also ==
- The Taking of Prince Harry (2010)
