= Ruth Jones =

Welsh actress, producer, and writer (born 1966)

Ruth Jones MBE
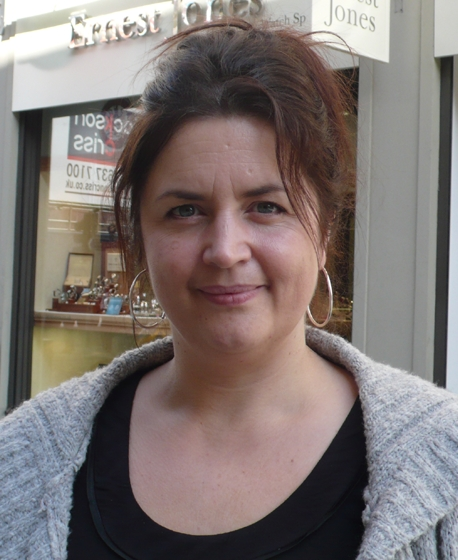
- Jones in 2008
- Born: Ruth Alexandra Elizabeth Jones; 22 September 1966 (age 60); Bridgend, Glamorgan, Wales
- Education: Royal Welsh College of Music & Drama
- Occupations: Actress; comedian; writer; producer
- Years active: 1991–present
- Spouse: David Peet (m. 1999; sep. 2024)

Ruth Alexandra Elizabeth Jones (born 22 September 1966) is a Welsh comedian, actress, writer, producer and singer. She co-wrote and co-starred in the BBC sitcom Gavin & Stacey (2007–2010, 2019, 2024), for which she won the BAFTA Award for Best Female Comedy Performance in 2025. She also co-wrote and starred in the Sky One comedy-drama Stella (2012–2017), for which she was nominated for the BAFTA Award for Best Female Comedy Performance and the BAFTA Cymru Award for Best Screenwriter.

Jones has also appeared in various other television series, including Fat Friends (2000–2005), Little Britain (2003–2007), Nighty Night (2004–2005), Saxondale (2006–2007), Little Dorrit (2008) and The Street (2009). Jones was appointed Member of the Order of the British Empire (MBE) in the 2014 New Year Honours, for services to entertainment.

== Early life and education ==
Ruth Alexandra Elizabeth Jones was born on 22 September 1966 in Bridgend, Glamorgan, Wales. Her father was a solicitor for the British Steel Corporation in Port Talbot, and her mother was a GP. She has two older brothers and a younger sister.

She grew up in Porthcawl and attended Porthcawl Comprehensive School. Actor and comedian Rob Brydon was also a pupil there, and the two appeared in school musicals together. She took part in musical theatre productions every year. After graduating from the University of Warwick with a degree in theatre studies and dramatic arts, she trained at the Royal Welsh College of Music & Drama in Cardiff.

== Career ==
=== Stage ===
In November 1989, Jones undertook her first professional role, with Dominic Cooke's company, Pan Optic, playing Countess Almaviva in Cooke's adaptation of The Marriage of Figaro, which toured the UK for six months. Thereafter, she undertook temporary clerical work.

She considered giving up acting and instead training to be a solicitor. In 1990, however, the comedian and pantomime producer Stan Stennett offered her an Equity contract, shifting scenery and playing a Teenage Mutant Ninja Turtle (Michelangelo) in Dick Whittington at the Grand Pavilion, Porthcawl where she had performed in school musicals.

In October 2018, Jones returned to the stage, after a 12-year absence, in the new play Nightingale by William Gaminara, produced by Jenny Topper at the Theatre Royal, Bath.

In Summer 2024, Jones played the role of Mother Superior in the West End production of Sister Act at the Dominion Theatre, alongside Beverley Knight, Alexandra Burke and Lizzie Bea.

=== Television ===
Her first television job was an unbroadcast sketch show for BBC Wales, which included Rob Brydon and Steve Speirs. Soon after, she joined an improvisational theatre group in Bath. That group included Julia Davis, with whom Jones later appeared in Nighty Night and Gavin & Stacey.

She first worked in television and radio comedy for BBC Wales in 1991. Theatre roles with the RSC and The National Theatre were followed by her performance in 1999 hit British film East Is East. In 1996, she appeared in the BBC television period drama Drovers' Gold, billed as a "Welsh Western" which told the story of a cattle drive from West Wales to London. Jones later commented, "I loved that job. I visited places like Lampeter and Llandeilo for the first time, as well as Abergavenny and Crickhowell. I fell in love with them all. There was something so unspoilt about them, and I've been back several times since."

Jones appeared on television as Kelly in four series of ITV's comedy Fat Friends, where she met James Corden. Afterwards she appeared in several BBC comedies, playing Myfanwy in Little Britain, Magz in Saxondale and Linda in Nighty Night.

Jones achieved prominence in 2007 as co-writer with James Corden of the BBC Three sitcom Gavin & Stacey, and playing the lead role of Nessa Jenkins. The series became a hit and was moved to BBC One. Jones said: "It wasn't as deliberate as us saying, 'Right, we're going to react against cynical comedy'. We just wrote what we wanted. And it just so happens that the show does generate a lot of warmth. People seem to like that, especially when things aren't terribly jolly. It's nice to have your cockles warmed."

The series won several awards, including two BAFTAs and four British Comedy Awards. Jones and co-star Rob Brydon recorded "Islands in the Stream" (a song performed by their characters in the programme) as a single for Comic Relief in 2009; the song reached No. 1 in the chart.

In 2008, Jones featured in two BBC One television period costume dramas, Tess of the d'Urbervilles and Little Dorrit, as well as two episodes of The Street. In December 2009, she starred in A Child's Christmas in Wales. In 2010, she starred in BBC Four comedy The Great Outdoors alongside Mark Heap, and, in December, presented the first of four chat shows on BBC2, Ruth Jones' Christmas Cracker. In January 2011, she starred as Hattie Jacques in BBC Four drama Hattie, which recounts Jacques' affair with her young driver John Schofield while she was married to actor John Le Mesurier, later known for his role in Dad's Army.

In 2008, Jones co-founded Tidy Productions with producer David Peet. The company produced the series Jones presented on BBC Radio Wales in 2008–9, Ruth Jones' Sunday Brunch. In 2010, the company had comedy and light entertainment production credits with BBC Two and BBC Three. It has made two 90-minute comedy dramas for S4C and light-entertainment shows for BBC Wales, and topical radio series What's the Story? for Radio Wales, predecessor to The Leek.

Tidy Productions also produced 58 episodes of the comedy drama Stella for Sky TV. The first series aired in 2012. It was Jones' first major comedy project since Gavin & Stacey; she created, executive produced and storylined the show with Peet. Jones stars in the title role, and wrote several episodes as well as co-writing episodes with Rob Gittins, Rob Evans, David Peet and Steve Speirs. Jones has stated she was worried about comparisons to Gavin & Stacey when setting a second programme in Wales and the company originally thought to set it in Bristol, but the decision was made to set it in the Rhondda Valley "I know people from the Valleys and it is just a joyously colourful place and full of characters." A second series of Stella was filmed in summer 2012 and aired in early 2013. A further four series plus two Christmas specials completed the run, with the final episode broadcast in October 2017.

In January 2018, Jones took the part of Mandy Haveez in Radio Wales comedy series Splott, written by David Peet and made by Tidy Productions. In March 2018, Jones worked with director Debbie Isitt, appearing in the film Nativity 4.

In 2020, she participated in Iaith ar Daith ('Language Road Trip'), a show for S4C where she and several other celebrities learned Welsh, broadcast in April 2020. An extra episode, Iaith ar Daith ‘Dolig ('Language Road Trip: Christmas') was broadcast at the end of 2020, interviewing each of the celebrities about whether they were still making use of their Welsh and the opportunities they had had to use Welsh during lockdown.

Once again teaming up with James Corden, together they wrote and starred in the final episode of Gavin & Stacey airing on Christmas Day 2024 on BBC One, 17 years after the show was first broadcast.

=== Writer ===
In April 2018, Jones's first novel, Never Greener, was published by Bantam Press. Based on a screenplay she'd written in 2004, it tells the story of a rekindled affair and the dangers of taking second chances. She signed a two-book deal with Transworld after a bidding war between ten publishing companies. The novel went into The Sunday Times' bestseller list at number seven after just three days of sales, before reaching the number-one slot for two consecutive weeks.

Jones' second novel, Us Three, was published by Bantam Press in September 2020. It follows the story of three friends whose futures become unpredictable after an unexpected turn in events.

Her third novel is Love Untold, which was published by Penguin Books in 2022.

== Personal life ==
Jones married David Peet, a television and radio producer, in 1999. She was step-mother to three children from Peet's previous marriage. In June 2025, she announced that the couple had parted in 2024 and were now legally separated but remained good friends. Since the separation, Jones has been living in London and Peet in Canada.

In 2010, Jones took part in Channel 4's Comedy Gala, a benefit show held in aid of Great Ormond Street Children's Hospital, filmed live at the O2 Arena in London on 30 March.

In January 2019, Jones was the guest for BBC Radio 4's Desert Island Discs. Her favourite music track was "Smooth" by Santana featuring Rob Thomas. Her choice of Bible was a family Welsh Bible, her book choice was Halliwell's Film Guide, and her luxury item was the back catalogue of The Archers.

== Recognition and awards ==
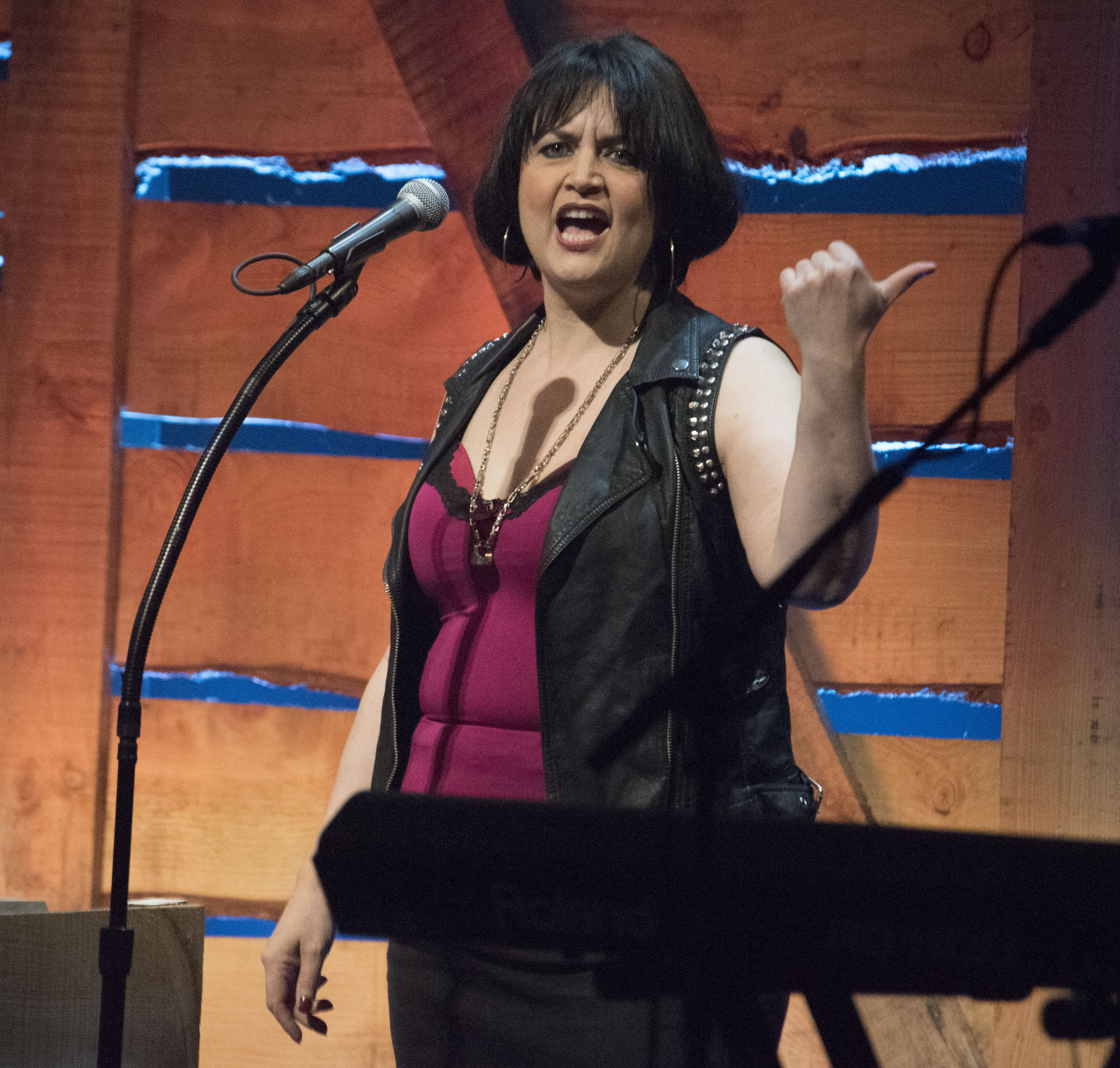
Ruth Jones as Nessa at the BBC Radio 2 Folk Awards 2015

Jones was judged the Best Female Comedy Newcomer at the 2007 British Comedy Awards, and was also nominated for Best Television Comedy Actress. She was also recipient of the Ultimate Funny Woman award at the annual Cosmopolitan Ultimate Women of the Year Awards in November 2009. In July 2013, Jones received an honorary degree from the University of Warwick. In November 2022, she was conferred the honorary degree of Doctor of the University of The Open University by The Open University in Wales, at the International Convention Centre Wales in Newport.

Jones was appointed Member of the Order of the British Empire (MBE) in the 2014 New Year Honours for services to entertainment.

Jones was awarded the BAFTA Cymru Sian Phillips Special Recognition Award in 2009. In 2012, Jones received a nomination for the British Academy Television Award for Best Female Comedy Performance for her performance in Stella.

In 2025, Jones was awarded the British Academy Television Award for Best Female Comedy Performance, for her role as Nessa in Gavin & Stacey. In March 2025, First Minister of Wales Eluned Morgan awarded her the First Minister's Special Award at the St David Awards, also for her role as Nessa.

== Filmography ==
=== Films ===
Year	Title	Character	Production	Ref.
1996	Emma	Bates' Maid	Miramax Films	
1998	The Theory of Flight	Becky	Fine Line Features	
1999	East Is East	Peggy	Film4	
2002	Heartlands	Mandy	Miramax	
2018	Nativity Rocks!	Farmer Beatie	Entertainment One	

=== Television ===
Year	Title	Character	Production	Notes	Ref.
2027	The Choir	Lisa	Apple TV	Upcoming comedy series, star & co-writer with James Corden	
2027	Better Later	Shelley-Ann	BBC One	Upcoming comedy series, star & co-writer with Steve Speirs	
2026	The Rapture	Mel Thomas	BBC One	Psychological Thiller	
2026	Run Away	Elena Ravenscroft	Netflix		
2026	The Other Bennet Sister	Mrs Bennet	BBC One		
2015–2016	One in Front and others	Jo		Series of adverts for Tesco	
2015–2016	Very British Problems	Herself	Alaska TV Productions	3 episodes	
2012–2017	Stella	Stella Morris	Sky 1	Tidy Production. 6 series and 2 Special	
2011, 2021–2024	Ruth Jones' Easter Treat	Chatshow	BBC Two	Special	
2011	Ruth Jones' Christmas Cracker	Chatshow	BBC Two	Special	
2011	Hattie	Hattie Jacques	BBC Four	1 episode	
2011	Ruth Jones' Summer Holiday	Chatshow	BBC Two	Special	
2010	Ruth Jones' Christmas Cracker	Chatshow	BBC Two	Special	
2010	The Great Outdoors	Christine	BBC Four	3 episodes	
2010	Marple	Miss Blenkinsopp	ITV	The Secret of Chimneys	
2010	Igam Ogam	Birdie and Narrator	Calon, Telegael	52 episodes	
2009	Ruth Jones' Christmas Cracker	Chatshow	BBC Two	Special	
2009	A Child's Christmases in Wales	Mum	BBC Four	TV film	
2009	The Street	Sandra Lucas	BBC One	Series 3, Episodes 5 and 6	
2009	Ar Y Tracs	Ingrid Crenski	S4C		
2008	Little Dorrit	Flora Finching	BBC One		
2008	Tess of the D'Urbervilles	Joan Durbeyfield	BBC One		
2008	Torchwood	Nikki Bevan	BBC Three	episode "Adrift"	
2008	Chaos at the Zoo	Narrator	Crackit Productions		
2007–2010, 2019, 2024	Gavin & Stacey	Nessa Jenkins	BBC	Star and co-writer BAFTA Award for Best Female Performance in a Comedy, 2025	
2006–2007	Saxondale	Magz	BBC Two	Series 1 and 2	
2006	Mayo	Cal Andrews	BBC One		
2005–2006	I'm With Stupid	Jean	BBC Three		
2005	Born and Bred	Ruby Moss	BBC One	Episode – The Element of Surprise	
2004–2005	Nighty Night	Linda	BBC		
2004	The Baby Juice Express	Gladys			
2003–2006	Little Britain	Myfanwy	BBC Three		
2003	Midsomer Murders	Rachael Rose	ITV	Episode – Bad Tidings	
2003	Roger Roger	Angelica	BBC One	Episode "Freedom's Just Another Word for Nothing Left to Lose"	
2003	EastEnders	Jenny Morgan	BBC One	Dot's Story	
2002	Heartlands	Mandy			
2001	Tales from Pleasure Beach	Mandy	BBC Two		
2001	Adrian Mole: The Cappuccino Years	Sharon Bott	BBC		
2000–2005	Fat Friends	Kelly Chadwick	ITV		
2000	Human Remains	Elaine	BBC	Episode "All Over My Glasses"	
2000	A Likeness in Stone	Joan Poole			
1998	Picking Up the Pieces	Marie	ITV		
1998	As Time Goes By	Gilly	BBC One	Episode "Pardon?"	
1997	Drovers' Gold	Mary	BBC1		

=== Guest appearances ===
Year	Title	Appearance	Series	Ref.
2024	Strictly Come Dancing	Vanessa Shanessa Jenkins	1 episode	
2015	The Apprentice: You're Fired!	Herself	Series 11, Episode 10	
2015	Would I Lie to You?	Panelist	Series 9, Episode 8	
2014	Duck Quacks Don't Echo	Herself	Series 1, Episode 1	
2013	The Jonathan Ross Show	Herself	Series 4, Episode 11	
2012	Hit the Road Jack	Herself	Series 1, Episode 1	
2012	Edinburgh International Television Festival 2012	Herself		
2012	The Matt Lucas Awards	Herself	Series 1, Episode 6	
2012	Just a Minute	Panelist	Series 1, Episode 3	
2012	Chris Moyles' Quiz Night	Herself	Series 5, Episode 7	
2011	Alan Carr Chatty Man	Herself	Series 7, Episode 7	
2010	The Big Fat Quiz of the Year	Herself	2010	
2010	Chris Moyles' Quiz Night	Herself	Series 3, Episode 4	
2010	The Graham Norton Show	Herself	Series 7 Episode 6	
2010	Would I Lie to You?	Panelist	Series 4, Episode 2	
2010	A League of Their Own	Panelist	Series 1 Episode 2	
2009	The Graham Norton Show	Herself	Series 5 Episode 2	
2009	Chris Moyles' Quiz Night	Herself	Series 1, Episode 2	
2009	Have I Got News for You	Guest Presenter	Series 37 Episode 7	
2009	Comic Relief	Nessa	″(Barry) Islands in the Stream″ video	

== Writing ==
=== Screen ===
Year	Title	Episodes	Notes	Ref.
2012–2017	Stella	Six series		
2007–2009, 2019, 2024	Gavin & Stacey	Three series and three Christmas specials	co-written with James Corden	
2009	Ar Y Tracs	Television movie		
2006	The Chase	1 episode		
2005	Fat Friends	1 episode	Series 4 Episode 3 "Angels Delight"	

=== Books ===
Year	Title	Notes	Ref.
2018	Never Greener	A passionate love affair that highlights why second chances should not always be given, or taken Published by Bantam.	
2020	Us Three	Three girls experience a turn of events, leaving their futures uncertain Published by Bantam.	
2022	Love Untold	A story of conflict between four generations of Welsh women. Published by Bantam.	
2025	By Your Side	Published by Bantam.	

== Production ==
- Gavin & Stacey (Series 1, 6 episodes: BBC3 and BBC2 2007)
- Gavin & Stacey (Series 2, 7 episodes: BBC3 2008)
- Gavin & Stacey (Christmas Special: December 2008)
- Gavin & Stacey (Series 3, 6 episodes: BBC1 2009,2010)
- Ar Y Tracs Exec. Producer Tidy Productions S4C 2009)

== Discography ==
- Islands in the Stream (cover version for Comic Relief)
