= List of Monarch of the Glen episodes =

The following is a list of episodes for the television show Monarch of the Glen.

== Series overview ==
Series	Episodes	Originally released	
Series	Episodes	First released	Last released
1	8	27 February 2000	16 April 2000
2	8	7 January 2001	25 February 2001
3	11	4 November 2001	20 January 2002
4	10	1 September 2002	3 November 2002
5	11	28 September 2003	28 December 2003
6	10	19 September 2004	21 November 2004
7	6	18 September 2005	23 October 2005

== Episodes ==
=== Series 1 (2000) ===
No. overall	No. in series	Directed by	Written by	Original release date	Viewers (millions)
1	1	Edward Bennett	Michael Chaplin	27 February 2000	8.38
Restaurateur Archie MacDonald is called to his Highland home of Glenbogle when his mother, Molly, informs him that his father has had an accident in the loch. When he returns home, Archie is informed that he his now the Laird of Glenbogle. Meanwhile, estate worker Golly and local teacher Katrina try to catch the gang who are stealing the estate's precious osprey eggs. First appearance of stars Hector, Molly, Archie and Katrina. First appearance of regulars Golly, Lexie and Duncan. First appearance of recurring guests Justine and Maureen.
2	2	Edward Bennett	Michael Chaplin	5 March 2000	7.49
A ruthless banker comes to Glenbogle and informs Archie that if the family cannot pay the outstanding debt, the bank will have no choice but to close Glenbogle. Desperate to save his family's home, Archie pulls out all the stops to persuade the bank to reconsider. Duncan and Katrina train for the annual Glenbogle Hill Race. Hector visits his friend and neighbour Kilwillie. Duncan is distraught when he realises that Lexie is flirting with Fleming, but he doesn't realise that's it all just a bluff to try to impress Fleming. First appearance of recurring guests Kilwillie and Fleming.
3	3	Edward Bennett	Michael Chaplin	12 March 2000	7.86
Archie's girlfriend, Justine, comes to Glenbogle for a short stay, but during her visit, notices some chemistry between Archie and Katrina. Kilwillie asks the family to host the Glenbogle Ball in his place. While making the rushed preparations for the family, Justine learns of a past tragedy that still haunts the MacDonald family. Duncan tries his pluck up the courage to ask Lexie to the ball, whilst Alan – an old flame of Katrina – arrives back in Glenbogle, with the aim to spite Archie and ruin the ball. First appearance of recurring guests Gordie, Alan and Flora.
4	4	Edward Bennett	Niall Leonard	19 March 2000	8.35
A genealogist comes to Glenbogle looking for the heir to the Ballantine clan. After getting a glimpse at the genealogist's papers, Duncan thinks that he could be the heir. Golly helps Archie to deal with two neighbours arguing over their goats. Meanwhile, after an old diary emerges, it appears that Katrina is in fact Hector's daughter; distraught with this revelation, Molly decides to move out. Archie and Katrina go on a trip to try to find out if they are in fact brother and sister.
5	5	A.J. Quinn	Niall Leonard	26 March 2000	7.61
Archie's older sister Lizzie turns up with her boyfriend, Gerald, and a group of massage therapists intent on turning Glenbogle into a healing centre. Meanwhile, Golly goes missing and Lexie discovers the secret to his disappearance. Lizzie reveals that she is pregnant and is not marrying Gerald, to Hector's disgust. Lizzie realises that there is a spark between her best friend, Katrina, and Archie, but Katrina denies the allegations and realises a truth about Lizzie herself... First appearance of recurring guest Lizzie.
6	6	A.J. Quinn	Patrick Wilde	2 April 2000	8.10
As the new laird to Glenbogle, Archie must accept Killwillie's challenge in competing against him in the annual Highland boat race. Archie hires a marketing manager and photographer to publicise his new Glenbogle spring water. Duncan decides that he wants to move away from Glenbogle and seeks the advice of the gay photographer who thinks that Duncan is gay too. Meanwhile, Katrina is put up for election on the Highland council and enlists the help of a woman from the marketing company to plan her election strategy against her opponent, Kilwillie.
7	7	A.J. Quinn	Michael Chaplin	9 April 2000	7.98
Archie and Justine organise a special Highland Night at their restaurant. To help execute the plan smoothly, Archie and Lexie head over to London to make the preparations. Golly gives Duncan the responsibility of leading the Glorious Twelfth shoot. Katrina and Kilwillie go head to head in the local election, but Kilwillie's loyalty seems non-existent when instead of campaigning, he joins Hector in the shoot. Katrina's chances are boosted when Alan returns to help her campaign and Molly realises that Katrina is the better candidate over Kilwillie.
8	8	A.J. Quinn	Michael Chaplin	16 April 2000	8.09
Justine tells Archie that he must decide whether or not to return to their restaurant in London or to stay at Glenbogle with his family. Archie learns that the house is in need of repairs costing in the hundreds of thousands. To make matters worse, Fleming returns to the glen to inform Archie that the bank can no longer wait for him to pay the estate's debts; Fleming suggests that Archie sell the village, prompting a rooftop protest by Hector. Meanwhile, revelations are made about Archie and Lexie's night on the train and Molly is upset that Hector has seemingly forgotten their 40th anniversary. Just when it appears that Archie and Katrina may finally get together, a familiar face returns and everything is shattered....

=== Series 2 (2001) ===
No. overall	No. in series	Directed by	Written by	Original release date	Viewers (millions)
9	1	Simon Massey	Michael Chaplin	7 January 2001	7.77
Fleming and two other bankers are put through their paces. Archie grows closer to Katrina; Justine, who has moved into the Big House sees this. Hector and Duncan fiddle with the newly installed webcams. Hector and Molly can't bear Justine and move out. Golly offers Katrina advice. Lexie persuades Fleming to follow his dream, meanwhile she clashes with Justine.
10	2	Simon Massey	Michael Chaplin	14 January 2001	7.69
Hector and Kilwillie try to retrieve their confiscated barrel of whisky from Archie. Golly, Duncan and new man Fergal battle for the Head Ranger position; Lexie and Molly help to dress Duncan for the occasion. Katrina and Fergal take a fancy to each other; Archie is disappointed. First appearance of recurring guest Fergal.
11	3	Simon Massey	Stuart Hepburn	21 January 2001	7.72
Fergal and Golly clash over who Duncan should work for. Lexie sees Duncan is upset and helps find him when he runs off. Archie's plan for a Glenbogle Tourist Attraction is rejected by local councillor Edith, Hector is forced to go and charm her. Archie and Katrina try to make the other councillors see sense. First appearance of recurring guest Badger.
12	4	Richard Signy	Patrick Wilde	28 January 2001	7.54
Hector tries to marry Archie off to a rich and beautiful young lady called Tanya; she and her father turn out to be robbers. Duncan shows a school party around the estate. Fergal and Katrina grow closer. An elderly tenant demands his croft back. Molly, Lexie and Golly organise Archie a birthday party.
13	5	Richard Signy	Niall Leonard	4 February 2001	7.36
Archie and Fergal attempt to renovate Katrina's old croft into a Victorian tourist attraction. Fergal thinks something is between Archie and Katrina. Molly plays with gambler Murdo to win her money back; Hector, Geordie and Golly watch on. Lexie asks Fergal out, but Duncan realises Fergal is already taken.
14	6	Richard Stroud	Niall Leonard	11 February 2001	7.37
Lexie's estranged mother Pamela comes to Glenbogle to marry her fiancé Eric. Pamela doesn't like Molly's flowers, Golly's bagpipes, and Hector insults the local vicar. The school is threatened with closure, Archie helps Katrina in her bid to keep it open. Fergal disappears for a few days and is offered a new job in New Zealand. First appearance of recurring guest Pamela.
15	7	Richard Stroud	James Mavor	18 February 2001	7.76
Heavily pregnant Lizzie arrives in the glen, ready to have her baby. Hector and Kilwillie compete in a Scotland's Highest Tree Contest; Duncan is forced to guard Hector's tree while a reporter visits Glenbogle. Fergal and Katrina prepare to leave the glen to Archie's disappointment. Molly and Lexie look after Lizzie, while Hector clashes with his daughter.
16	8	Richard Stroud	Michael Chaplin	25 February 2001	7.75
An American millionaire, Joe, comes to Glenbogle to take the Lairdship from Archie. Lexie plans to tell Archie she loves him, but Archie has his heart set on Katrina. Joe's son plays tricks on Duncan, while Molly tries to put Joe's wife off Glenbogle. Kilwillie, Archie and Hector plan to organise Highland Games to prove Archie is the rightful Laird.

=== Series 3 (2001–2002) ===
No. overall	No. in series	Directed by	Written by	Original release date	Viewers (millions)
17	1	Richard Stroud	Michael Chaplin	4 November 2001	6.71
Banker Stella Moon arrives in the glen to take over the day-to-day running of the estate. Hector and Kilwillie battle it out to be the new Golf Club President; Molly decides to help Kilwillie, Golly helps Hector. Katrina is offered a new job in London to Archie's shock. Lexie organizes a Worker's Revolt to stop Stella's plans. First appearance of recurring guest Stella.
18	2	Richard Stroud	Niall Leonard	11 November 2001	7.10
Lexie, Duncan and Golly go on strike after being told they must have pay cuts. Hector and Molly head for a divorce when they are forced to share a room. Archie has to cope when the lights, electricity and boiler go off. Stella sends Hector's dogs away to Kilwillie, while Lexie starts to think she doesn't belong at Glenbogle, Duncan starts campaigning and Golly wants to continue to work.
19	3	Richard Stroud	Mark Holloway	18 November 2001	6.92
Stella sends Golly to prison when she catches him selling Glenbogle's fish. Archie tries to train Duncan to be ghillie for an important fishing party. Molly reads Lexie's tea leaves and sees love... Hector and Kilwillie protest, go fishing and get locked up too. Molly is the three's defence in court, Duncan is the surprise witness. Stella is forced to move out. First appearance of recurring guest Auntie Liz.
20	4	Richard Signy	Andrew Taft	25 November 2001	6.32
Golly's ex Alison and their daughter Jess turn up in Glenbogle. Kilwillie persuades Hector to join a secret organization called the Highland Hundred. Archie and Stella prepare to sell derelict cottages to conman Stuart McIntosh who has his eye on Lexie. Duncan gives Stella some much needed help, and Golly tries to get to know Jess. First appearance of regular Jess. First appearance of recurring guest Stuart.
21	5	Richard Signy	Harriet O'Carroll	2 December 2001	7.33
Stuart plans to renovate the mountain Ben Bogle into a holiday village; Archie, Hector and Golly rebel against this. Molly investigates an ancient battle in the hills of Glenbogle. Duncan gets stuck in some handcuffs, Lexie and Stuart start to date. Stella is unsure whether to support Archie or to support Stuart and please the bank.
22	6	Richard Signy	Niall Leonard	8 December 2001	Under 5.92
Stella's ex husband Graeme arrives in the glen to write a report on Glenbogle. Duncan tries to get the tourists flooding into Glenbogle, while Molly tries to sell more paintings. Hector feels useless and is shouted at by Stella and runs off to a local pub. Lexie finds Graeme is insulting Glenbogle in his report and informs Archie who writes an 'alternative' version. First appearance of recurring guest Toby.
23	7	Marcus D.F. White	Mark Holloway	16 December 2001	6.68
Duncan's pen pal Marie-Helene decides to come to stay at Glenbogle; Duncan has been telling Marie-Helene he is Laird and Archie is forced to be Head Ranger for the week. Archie has to deal with a Health Inspector, while Lexie and Stella battle it out for the affections of Archie. Molly starts to recognise the Inspector, Mr. Barr, and Duncan falls in love with Marie-Helene.
24	8	Marcus D.F. White	Andrew Taft	23 December 2001	6.02
Hector has a Regimental Reunion of his war friends, and his old pal Toad appears to be on the run from the police. Lexie ruins a pricey painting, Stella is determined to shame Lexie and make her pay herself. Archie and Hector plan to help Toad escape, as Duncan is helping two policemen who are on the lookout for Toad.
25	9	Richard Stroud	John Martin Johnson	30 December 2001	6.86
Stella is told she can leave Glenbogle, but she has fallen in love with Archie; she sets about ruining the Midsummer's Ball so she can stay. Duncan pays for a beautiful dress for Lexie, while Hector and Molly go in search to Kilwillie for an ancient 1/3 of the Glenbogle Stone. Archie has to decide whom he loves. First appearance of recurring guest P. C. Callum.
26	10	Richard Stroud	Michael Chaplin	13 January 2002	7.14
Archie and Lexie are shocked at the response from the family at the announcement of their engagement. Duncan insults Lexie, and Golly helps Archie find a piece of gold for a ring. Hector and Kilwillie are determined to catch a pike, while Molly's brother Jolyon finds his old love... First appearance of recurring guest Jolyon. Last appearance of Hector.
27	11	Richard Stroud	Michael Chaplin	20 January 2002	7.74
Archie staggers through Hector's funeral; Molly cannot hold back the tears. Lexie's mum offers to pay Hector's death duties and tries to organise Lexie and Archie's wedding herself. Golly and Molly have an emotional late night talk; Archie and Lexie have a tear-filled talk themselves. Archie sees the Ghost of Hector, while Lexie starts to get cold feet. First appearance of recurring guest McGregor.

=== Series 4 (2002) ===
No. overall	No. in series	Directed by	Written by	Original release date	Viewers (millions)
28	1	Richard Stroud	John Martin Johnson	1 September 2002	
Molly returns from her trip to Africa, and is determined for everything to be the same. Archie has built a Wolf Centre, but Golly is not in support. Lexie battles it out with Irene Stuart for the position of Housekeeper. Duncan wants to be the Wolf Centre's Headkeeper, but is not experienced enough. Molly and Kilwillie clear out Hector's old clothes. First appearance of recurring guest Irene.
29	2	Richard Stroud	Mark Holloway	8 September 2002	
Young girl Esme comes to Glenbogle for a holiday job; Duncan takes a fancy to her. Molly clashes with Archie's godmother, Isobel who comes to give Archie a grant for a Wildlife Centre. Duncan accidentally goes on a date with Irene, leaving Golly and Esme disappointed. Archie is suspicious about Esme, while Lexie trusts her. Molly and Kilwillie investigate Isobel's past. Guest Starring: Phyllida Law as Isobel Hogg.
30	3	Richard Signy	Niall Leonard	15 September 2002	
Katrina returns to win back the Head teacher position and Archie's heart. Molly's friend Louis wants to replace Archie as Laird and Hector as Molly's husband, while Golly buys new clothes and a car to impress his crush, Irene. Lexie starts to not trust Archie, who promises he still loves her. Duncan tests out a new tracking device on his runaway rabbit. Guest Starring: Leslie Phillips as Louis Grimshaw.
31	4	Richard Signy	Leslie Stewart	22 September 2002	
Archie's old friend David arrives with a friend, Jonathan. Molly rescues a wolf cub from the Wolf Pen to Kilwillie's surprise. Golly tries once again to woo Irene, with Duncan trying to ensure Irene prefers him not Golly. David and Archie play lots of sport, David offers Archie a dodgy deal and David makes a pass at the suspicious Lexie.
32	5	Richard Stroud	Andrew Taft	29 September 2002	
A wolf escapes from the pen and Golly, Kilwillie, Archie and Duncan attempt to find it. Golly's eyesight starts to wear away and Kilwillie tries to impress Irene. Duncan is caught kissing Irene and mistakenly books a party of naturists (who Molly has to take care of) onto the estate camp.
33	6	Richard Signy	Rob Fraser	6 October 2002	
Molly tries to sell her paintings to an art dealer, and is taken to an art party by Irene. Lexie is worried about Golly who has run away, and sends him food. Archie and Duncan try to find a missing child from a school party, but come across Golly instead. Irene comes across a blast from the past, and Lexie tries to sell some of the estate paintings.
34	7	Robert Knights	Andrew Taft	13 October 2002	
A Greg MacDonald tries to take the Lairdship from Archie who is once again in debt, needing to pay his father's death duties. Kilwillie, who has fallen for Molly, decides he can repay the death duties by marrying Molly, while Lexie learns that Irene is pregnant. Golly meets Andrew Booth who wants to find his relatives in the Highlands, Archie and Lexie try to force Greg away. First appearance of recurring guest Andrew.
35	8	Julian Holmes	Mark Holloway	20 October 2002	
Duncan's Aunt Liz tries to help Molly make contact with Hector from beyond the grave. Lexie starts to think there is a ghost in the house, while Archie attempts to renovate Jamie's old room for a future child of his and Lexie's. Duncan gets in a fight over Irene at the pub, and Molly tries to make friends with Andrew.
36	9	Robert Knights	Colin Wyatt	27 October 2002	
A man called Paul turns up on the estate, saying he is Golly's son. Lexie tries to organise a Ball, with Molly and her friends just getting in the way. Paul turns out to be Hector's son, and Archie's half-brother, to Archie's horror. Duncan helps track down the injured Big Eric. Kilwillie and Andrew battle it out for Molly's affections. First appearance of regular Paul.
37	10	Julian Holmes	John Martin Johnson	3 November 2002	
Archie orders Paul to get off his land, Lexie is determined for Paul to stay. Molly finds out about Paul and plans to leave Glenbogle for a round-the-world trip with Andrew, upsetting Kilwillie. Duncan feels useless, but Golly and Paul encourage him. Kilwillie goes to battle with Golly over the rights to a water spring.

=== Series 5 (2003) ===
No. overall	No. in series	Directed by	Written by	Original release date
38	1	Richard Signy	Niall Leonard	28 September 2003
Archie gets cold feet and tries to persuade Lexie to join him in a quest to the USA offered by Kilwillie. Andrew and Golly help Molly out when she is exploited by a local arts dealer. Duncan finds a World War II bomb in an old box belonging to his ageing great uncle Angus. First appearance of recurring guest Dorothy.
39	2	Richard Signy	Mark Holloway	5 October 2003
The family go to Duncan's B&B during the repairs to the house. Molly and Andrew get closer when Molly needs driving lessons. Archie's half brother Paul returns to live in the glen, but has a police trail behind him. Duncan shows two food writers around the Big House to impress them and get publicity for Archie.
40	3	Richard Signy	Andrew Taft	12 October 2003
Andrew thinks Molly is cheating on him when he overhears Molly with another man; but she has really set up a dating agency. Duncan gets two dates, and must visit both in one night! Paul sets work on the building of the Activity Centre, but a resident called Ron has other plans and boycotts the centre. Lexie's new community mini bus is ruined in a crash. First appearance of recurring guest Hermione.
41	4	Robert Knights	Leslie Stewart	19 October 2003
Paul takes care of 'The Stags', the Glenbogle football team who are set to play their annual football match against their bitter rivals. Archie travels to Glasgow to help Golly to find out more info about his daughter Jess's boyfriend who has returned to the glen. Lexie takes a young footballer under her wing. Duncan goes for a job interview, to his girlfriend Hermione's annoyance.
42	5	Robert Knights	Jeremy Front	26 October 2003
Local lad Ewan is causing conflict in the glen, but Paul pities him and takes him into employment. Lady Dorothy plans to build an Eco-Dome, but needs access through Archie's land for her plan to succeed - Lexie is suspicious and goes to investigate. Jess tries to impress her father, Golly so she can get a job on the estate. Hermione employs Duncan with disastrous consequences. First appearance of regular Ewan.
43	6	Robert Knights	Michael Chaplin	2 November 2003
Archie's sister Lizzie comes back to Glenbogle, and asks him to go climb a mountain with her in Nepal. Golly plans to propose to Molly, but it seems Andrew has got there first. Archie and Paul clash again, with Lexie stuck in the middle. Duncan and Jess are both offered the Head Ranger job, but they can't decide who should have it. Last appearance of Archie.
44	7	Ian Knox	John Martin Johnson	9 November 2003
Lexie takes over Archie's position at the local distillery, but after a meeting with an attractive blonde called Amanda, Paul decides he wants the position. Jess's uni friend Guy causes havoc, and Duncan tries to stop it. Golly is devastated when Andrew and Molly start to make plans for their wedding and moving in together. First appearance of recurring guest Amanda.
45	8	Ian Knox	Andrew Taft	16 November 2003
Andrew starts packing to move away from Glenbogle and, after a clash with Lady Dorothy, Ewan decides to join him. Lexie, Dorothy, Golly and Molly get marooned on an island in the middle of the loch, while Paul starts to think Jess has a crush on him. Hermione returns to win back Duncan, and locks him in her castle to ensure she wins her prize.
46	9	Brian Kelly	Mark Holloway	23 November 2003
Golly goes to retrieve a quaich for Molly from London when it is time for a MacDonald clan gathering. Ewan is hired to do the food and Lexie brings in a camera crew to film the event, but an obnoxious guest, Charles, still is not happy. Paul helps Amanda plan the spreading of her late father's ashes, but Charles refuses to let a McLeish on MacDonald territory as Jess and Duncan get closer to Golly's disgust.
47	10	Brian Kelly	Niall Leonard	30 November 2003
Lexie's estranged father turns up in Glenbogle, on the run from a vicious man named 'Billy the Butcher'. Golly comes to terms with Duncan and Jess going out, but Jess cannot cope with Duncan constantly being around her. Paul finds Amanda is married and must decide on the future of their relationship. Molly and Golly try to buy a horse from a dotty old woman called Edith, and they must decide their fate when Edith offers them the whole farm...
48	11	Robert Knights	Michael Chaplin	28 December 2003
Paul investigates his roots after a dream about his great grandfather. Lexie finds Archie wants to give up his Lairdship, and give it to Paul. Duncan plays tricks on a ghosthunter, while Jess and Ewan play tricks of their own. Molly is devastated Archie is leaving and takes it out on Paul, while Golly tells the tale of 'Mad Malcolm' and Jess suspects Duncan is cheating on her with the ghost hunter’s daughter.

=== Series 6 (2004) ===
No. overall	No. in series	Directed by	Written by	Original release date
49	1	Robert Knights	Niall Leonard	19 September 2004
Paul is now Laird of Glenbogle, and is annoyed when Lexie returns from her and Archie's vineyard in New Zealand and constantly interrupts him. Duncan plans to propose to Jess, who is baby-sitting a rare orchid with Molly, while Ewan runs from a radio authority officer who is to trying to ban his pirate radio station. Golly is loaned out for advice to other estate owners, and city girl Isobel tries to win her late grandmother's farm back from local farmer Sheriff Reavey. First appearance of regular Isobel.
50	2	Robert Knights	John Martin Johnson	26 September 2004
Paul's uncle Donald arrives in Glenbogle in police custody after being arrested for driving offences. Lexie tries to organise Molly a birthday party, but Molly is adamant she does not want one. Duncan pretends he is drunk after a dry evening with friend Speccy. While Isobel tries to sell her produce to Paul and has a girly night in with Jess. First appearance of regular Donald.
51	3	Robert Knights	Leslie Stewart	3 October 2004
Duncan gets cold feet and sees his potential as a DJ after he does a radio show for Ewan, who has broken his foot. A secret is revealed about Donald and Molly after Isobel finds letters from the past in an old car. Golly consoles Jess, who does not want Duncan to leave, while Donald goes on the run from Molly after hitting her with a board ore. Ewan's mum buys him a car and tries to persuade him to return home while Lexie plans to return to New Zealand after her kiss with Paul, but Paul is determined to discuss the kiss. Last appearance of Lexie.
52	4	David Caffrey	Jeremy Front & Michael Chaplin	10 October 2004
Jess misses Duncan and Ewan takes her to the pub where they meet the feisty barmaid Zoe who is determined to win Ewan's heart. A mysterious World War II fighter plane is found in the loch, and Isobel must cover up her godfather who was in the plane when it crashed. Paul finds his old army officer is leading the investigation of the plane, while Golly consoles Molly after she is diagnosed with a heart condition. First appearance of recurring guests Alex, Dr. McKendrick & Zoë.
53	5	David Caffrey	Dan Sefton	17 October 2004
Donald's old mechanic friend Jackie McIntyre comes to Glenbogle for his stag do, and causes havoc with Donald and Ewan in the village. Golly meets the new dancing teacher Meg, and Jess organises a date for them. Alex becomes the estate factor, makes Paul be a traditional Laird, and exploits Isobel over a proposal about her trees. First appearance of recurring guest Meg. Guest Starring: Robert Fyfe as Jackie McIntyre.
54	6	David Caffrey	Andrew Rattenbury	24 October 2004
A tramp called Liam stumbles upon Isobel after losing his memory, and Paul tries to help him retrieve what he can remember. Molly returns to the glen but is disappointed to find Golly has a girlfriend. Molly reveals all the photos of Donald have been taken away from the house, while Isobel's old boss Kelly starts to date the smitten Ewan and attempts to get Isobel back to Edinburgh. Guest Starring: James Fleet as Liam.
55	7	Paul Harrison	Rob Fraser	31 October 2004
Jess tries to take care of a bunch of poachers on the estate, while Golly is away on a holiday with Meg on the coast. Paul meets his new neighbour Lucy, who starts to take a fancy to the Laird. Meg is offered a job on a boat cruise, and Ewan and Donald try to take care of the poachers themselves, while Isobel has too much to drink at Lucy's party. First appearance of recurring guests Chester, Lucy, Derek & Tam.
56	8	Paul Harrison	John Martin Johnson	7 November 2004
Lucy's boss Chester tries to woo Isobel and challenges Paul to a clay pigeon shooting contest to see who will run Isobel's chutney business. Donald sees his old flame Moira in Glenbogle, and is determined to run from the estate and make a new life with his sweetheart. Ewan offers Jess as a prize on his radio show, while Meg feels she is relying on Golly too much... First appearance of recurring guest Rory the Vet.
57	9	Robert Knights	Leslie Stewart	14 November 2004
Ewan drowns his sorrows at the pub and is arrested by the police after finding his father is cheating on his mum. Paul meets Lucy's parents, and Donald saves the day by arranging a meal for the party. Chester tries to organise a date for him and Isobel, while Jess investigates why Golly hasn't been sleeping in his croft.
58	10	Robert Knights	Niall Leonard	21 November 2004
Donald takes advantage when the clan Proctor reveals he is the rightful Laird of Glenbogle. Molly returns to find a photo of her and her late son Jamie missing, and Meg returns to reveal she is pregnant. Ewan uncovers a plot by Donald to take over Glenbogle, while Paul moves in with Golly, Lucy helps Donald in a quiz to see who is the rightful Laird, and the family prepare an attack on Glenbogle to win back the house... Last appearance of Isobel.

=== Series 7 (2005) ===
No. overall	No. in series	Directed by	Written by	Original release date
59	1	David Caffrey	Leslie Stewart	18 September 2005
Golly has to decide whether to give his new son Cameron away to his late partner Meg's sister or whether to keep him. Duncan returns to the glen, but Jess is not happy that he hasn't contacted her. Zoe is determined to make Ewan get them a holiday in the med, but Ewan messes up the payment. Paul accidentally burns down his tenant Iona's croft, while Molly is forced to get a job as a dinner lady after she, Donald and Ewan go to the races and spend the money for the new generator. First appearance of regular Iona. First appearance of recurring guests Cameron, Frank, Angus & Reverend Fraser.
60	2	David Caffrey	Eirene Houston	25 September 2005
Kilwillie returns to Glenbogle with his PA Edith, but Molly suspects she is simply a gold digger. Paul's goddaughter Amy runs away to Glenbogle, but fakes her age and causes havoc in the glen. Zoe and Ewan's relationship is ruined after a passionate moment in the kitchen with Amy. Poacher Tam is let out of prison and tries to buy some land from Paul and succeeds in ruining Golly and Jess' fishing party... First appearance of regular Amy.
61	3	David Caffrey	Dan Sefton	2 October 2005
Ewan tries to win back Zoe by jumping in the loch wearing just his boxers, while a Russian millionaire, Viktor comes to Glenbogle to make an investment. Amy, Donald, Iona and Ewan help Paul impress Viktor and his wife Catriona, while Golly hurts his back and Molly comes to his aid. Donald starts to make a new friend, in the shape of Catriona's panther Yuri!
62	4	Edward Bennett	Michael Chaplin	9 October 2005
Ewan calls in the scientists and brings in the press when a 'monster' is found in the loch. Golly and Molly spy on Jess who takes a fancy to one of the scientists. Golly explains to Paul the myth of the Glenbogle loch monster. Amy takes a job at a loch supermarket, while Iona starts to get suspicious about the scientists.
63	5	Edward Bennett	John Martin Johnson	16 October 2005
Iona's ex fiance, Malcolm, comes to Glenbogle to sort out Paul's tree problem, as Paul starts to realise he loves Iona. Ewan realises how much he likes Amy after getting jealous when Molly hires her a dashing art tutor. Molly helps Jess train for a competition for the glen's best ghillie, as Jess tries to show Golly how much she is trying to impress him. Paul sets up a saw mill to save Glenbogle's trees. First appearance of recurring guest Malcolm.
64	6	Edward Bennett	Michael Chaplin	23 October 2005
The Ghost of Hector shows himself as Molly asks for help to decide on her new husband - Golly or Kilwillie. Paul tries to hide his feelings for Iona as he is asked to give Iona away at her wedding with Malcolm. Jess starts to miss Duncan, as Ewan and Amy try to save Donald from going to an old people's home. The estate is put up for sale and everyone makes arrangements for new homes as Paul and Golly become lovesick and the strength of Glenbogle's residents is put to the test...
