= The Miracle (1991 film) =

1991 Irish film

- Directed by: Neil Jordan
- Written by: Neil Jordan
- Produced by: Redmond Morris; Stephen Woolley
- Starring: Beverly D'Angelo; Donal McCann; Niall Byrne; Lorraine Pilkington
- Cinematography: Philippe Rousselot
- Edited by: Joke van Wijk
- Music by: Anne Dudley
- Distributed by: Miramax Films; Palace Films
- Release dates: 5 April 1991 (United Kingdom); 3 July 1991 (United States)
- Running time: 96 minutes
- Country: United Kingdom
- Language: English
- Box office: $835,519

The Miracle is a 1991 drama film written and directed by Neil Jordan. It stars Beverly D'Angelo, Donal McCann, and Niall Byrne. It was entered into the 41st Berlin International Film Festival.

== Plot ==
Two teenage friends, Jimmy (Niall Byrne) and Rose (Lorraine Pilkington) live in the small seaside town of Bray, Ireland. They spend their days wandering the streets and piers. To kill time, Rose and Jimmy make up stories about strangers on the street. One day, while watching people at the train station, a stylish older woman, Renee Baker (Beverly D'Angelo), stands out so imposingly from the dull townsfolk that Jimmy and Rose decide to follow her, infatuated with knowing everything about her. They pursue her to the beach and at last Renee speaks to them. When she looks at Jimmy, he's at once infatuated with this mystifying woman. Rose, who has feelings for Jimmy herself, decides to make him jealous by sleeping with a young lion tamer from a travelling circus (although she claims her real motivation was to set the animals free). Renee is eventually revealed to be Jimmy's mother, whom his father, Sam, had claimed was dead.

== Cast ==
- Beverly D'Angelo as Renee Baker
- Donal McCann as Sam
- Niall Byrne as Jimmy
- Lorraine Pilkington as Rose
- J. G. Devlin as Mr. Beausang
- Cathleen Delany as Miss Strange
- Tom Hickey as Tommy
- Shane Connaughton as Rose's Father
- Mikkel Gaup as Jonner

== Reception ==
=== Critical reception ===
The film got mixed reviews upon its release in 1991. Critic Roger Ebert of the Chicago Sun-Times gave the film a two star rating out of four saying, "Strange, how a movie of such delicate romantic sensibilities could go astray because of a heavy-handed plot." On Rotten Tomatoes the film has a 70% rating, based on reviews from 10 critics.

=== Box office ===
The Miracle was released on 3 July 1991 in the United States and made $12,076 in its opening weekend. The film made a mere $835,519 all together when it ended its run on 10 October 1991 with its widest release being in 41 theatres.

== Availability ==
After the film's theatrical run, the film was released on videocassette in January 1992 by Live Home Video and around the same time in Canada by Cineplex Odeon and MCA.
