= Hit the Road Jack (TV series) =

- Directed by: Simon Dinsell; Chris Faith; Iain Wimbush
- Presented by: Jack Whitehall
- Country of origin: United Kingdom
- Original language: English
- No. of series: 1
- No. of episodes: 7 (list of episodes)

Production
- Running time: 24 minutes

Original release
- Network: Channel 4
- Release: 20 March – 1 May 2012

Hit the Road Jack is a British comedy television series. It is shown on Channel 4 and features Jack Whitehall touring the UK, performing stand-up comedy. Each episode is about 24 minutes long. Rory Jennings was the show runner.

== Episode list ==
No.	Title	Guest(s)	Original release date	Viewers (millions)
1	"Wales"	Ruth Jones	20 March 2012	1.3
2	"Newcastle"	Alan Shearer	27 March 2012	0.62
3	"Glasgow"	John Hannah and Greg McHugh	3 April 2012	0.47
4	"Manchester"	Andrew Flintoff	10 April 2012	0.66
Whitehall becomes a tattoo artist.
5	"Bristol"	David Walliams	17 April 2012	0.45
Whitehall sprays murals on walls, claiming to those in the buildings that he is Banksy.
6	"Essex"	Joe Thomas and Olly Murs	24 April 2012	0.4
Whitehall is in Basildon where he becomes a fashion photographer.
7	"Best of Show"	N/A	1 May 2012	0.27
