= Rough Diamond (TV series) =

- Starring: Conor Mullen; Stanley Townsend; Lorraine Pilkington; Ben Davies
- Countries of origin: United Kingdom; Ireland
- No. of episodes: 6

Production
- Running time: 60 minutes
- Production company: World Productions

Original release
- Network: BBC One in UK; RTÉ in Republic of Ireland
- Release: 4 February – 11 March 2007

Rough Diamond is a television series co-produced by BBC Northern Ireland and RTÉ. The series also appears on RTÉ One in the Republic of Ireland

The story explores the relationship between discredited racehorse trainer Aidan Doherty and Jonah Price, the son he never knew existed. The first episode begins with Doherty about to sell his run down stables to his neighbour and former employer Charlie Carrick, wealthy owner of the neighbouring Firebrand stables, and move to New South Wales. However, his best laid plans change when a young man appears, later revealed to be his son, Price.

The series is directed by Simon Massey and Dermot Boyd and produced by Peter Norris.

== Production ==
Rough Diamond was a six-part drama series co-produced by BBC Northern Ireland and RTÉ, airing on BBC One and RTÉ One in 2007. The series was produced by Peter Norris, with executive producers Tony Garnett for World Productions and Stephen Wright for BBC Northern Ireland. The writing team included Robert Jones (episodes 1, 2, and 6), Sergio Casci (episode 3), and Ted Gannon (episodes 4 and 5). Direction was split between Simon Massey (episodes 1, 2, 5, and 6) and Dermot Boyd (episodes 3 and 4). Filming took place entirely in County Kildare, Ireland, with equestrian experts hired to train actors for realistic horse-racing scenes.

== Cast ==
Character	Played by	Notes
Aidan Doherty	Conor Mullen	Impoverished racehorse trainer.
Charlie Carrick	Stanley Townsend	Rich racehorse owner and Aidan's neighbour.
Yolanda Carrick	Lorraine Pilkington	Glamorous wife of Charlie.
Jonah Price	Ben Davies	English-raised son of Aidan.
JP	Jon Lolis	Polish stable boy working for Mr Carrick.
Sheridan Carrick	Muireann Bird	Daughter of Charlie. Exhasperated at Jonah.
Dermot Cahill	Eamon Morrissey	Aidan's friend and assistant.
Ray Hogan	Garrett Lombard	Shady horse dealer.
Brett Hooper	Peter Gaynor	Aidan's replacement as the Carricks' trainer.

== Reception ==
Despite initial expectations, Rough Diamond was not recommissioned for a second series by the BBC. While the show garnered successful ratings in both Ireland and the UK, it did not meet the BBC's anticipated reception. A BBC source stated, "It wasn't quite the hit it was expected to be. As a result, the drama department has decided not to go ahead with a second series."
