= Kellyanne Farquhar =

Scottish actress

Kellyanne Farquhar is a Scottish television actress. She joined the cast of the BBC's Monarch of the Glen for its final series in 2005, starring as boarding school runaway Amy McDougal.

She won a Scottish Bafta Best First Time Performance for her role in Monarch. She also appeared in the New Found Land film Night People which won the audience award at the Bafta Scotland awards 2005.

Kellyanne graduated from Edinburgh’s Queen Margaret University College’s School of Drama in 2004.
