= Terence Harvey =

British actor (1944–2017)

Terence John Humes (October 1944 – 7 September 2017), known professionally as Terence Harvey, was a British actor. Among his many roles was the prosecution counsel in The Execution of Gary Glitter. He also appeared in From Hell, Johnny English, Hollyoaks, The White Countess, Mr. Selfridge, Hustle, Downton Abbey, The Damned United and Hitler: The Rise of Evil, where he played Hitler's ill-fated rival Gustav von Kahr.

== Filmography ==
| Year | Title | Role | Notes |
|---|---|---|---|
| 1986 | Sky Bandits | Canning | |
| 1989 | The Phantom of the Opera | Insp. Hawkins | |
| 1993 | Prime Suspect 3 | John Kennington | |
| 1996 | Secrets & Lies | First Bride's Father | |
| 1997 | The Man Who Knew Too Little | Herr Schuster | |
| 2001 | From Hell | Benjamin 'Ben' Kidney | |
| 2001 | The Discovery of Heaven | Party Chief | |
| 2003 | Johnny English | Official at Funeral | |
| 2003 | Hitler: The Rise of Evil | Gustav von Kahr | 2 episodes |
| 2004 | If Only | Trahem | |
| 2005 | The Trial of the King Killers | Henry Marten | |
| 2005 | The White Countess | Walters | |
| 2006 | Basic Instinct 2 | Henry Rose | |
| 2006 | Rosemary & Thyme | Victor Channing | |
| 2009 | The Damned United | FA Committee Chairman | |
| 2010 | Mr. Nice | Old Bailey Judge | |
| 2012 | Tezz | Home Minister | |
| 2013 | I Give It a Year | Alec | |
| 2017 | Viceroy's House | Sir Fred Burrows | |
