= Drovers' Gold =

Welsh drama TV series

- Genre: Historical drama
- Created by: Michael Chaplin
- Written by: Michael Chaplin
- Directed by: Tristram Powell; Lesley Manning
- Starring: David Calder; Andrew Howard; Emma Fielding; Ruth Jones; Danny Llewelyn; Sharon Geater; Alun Jones; Robert Pugh; John Standing; Aneirin Hughes; Freddie Jones; Steve Speirs; Keith Barron
- Composer: John Altman
- Countries of origin: United Kingdom; Wales
- Original language: English
- No. of series: 1
- No. of episodes: 5

Production
- Producers: Ruth Caleb; Anji Dyer
- Production locations: Abergavenny, Wales, UK; Crickhowell, Wales, UK
- Cinematography: Ray Orton
- Editors: John Richards; Chris Swanton
- Running time: 95 minutes (ep. 1); 50 minutes (eps. 2–5)
- Production company: BBC Wales

Original release
- Network: BBC1
- Release: 30 May – 27 June 1997

Drovers' Gold is a five-part British television historical drama series, first broadcast on BBC1 on 30 May 1997. A single series comprises five episodes were broadcast, with the concluding episode broadcasting on 27 June 1997. Episodes broadcast at 21:30 on Friday nights.

== Plot ==
The series set in 19th-century Wales, where struggling families embark on a cattle drive to London for better prices. They face numerous challenges, including an unscrupulous landowner, disease outbreaks, and legal troubles, as they strive to escape poverty and build a better future.

== Casting ==
According to a culture interview in 2018 at Wales.com, Ruth Jones says to be billed as a "Welsh Western" which told the story of a cattle drive from West Wales to London. Jones later commented, "I loved that job. I visited places like Lampeter and Llandeilo for the first time, as well as Abergavenny and Crickhowell. I fell in love with them all. There was something so unspoilt about them, and I've been back several times since."

== Cast ==
- David Calder as Vaughan
- Andrew Howard as Aaron
- Emma Fielding as Elizabeth
- Ruth Jones as Mary
- Danny Llewelyn as Isaiah
- Sharon Geater as Rebecca
- Alun Jones as Dafydd
- Robert Pugh as Handl
- John Standing as Sir Huw
- Aneirin Hughes as Daniel
- Freddie Jones as "Moc" Morgan
- Steve Speirs as Lewis
- Keith Barron as Sir Thomas

== Episodes ==
| No. | Title | Directed by | Written by | Airdate |
|---|---|---|---|---|
| 1 | "Episode 1" | Tristram Powell | Michael Chaplin | 30 May 1997 |
Tenant farmer, Ruth Jones is facing a battle against her landlord who wants to force his tenants from their homes. Her older son Aaron tries to recruit drovers to take the cattle to London as an English cattle drover Vaughan will not give Ruth a fair price.
| 2 | "Episode 2" | Tristram Powell | Michael Chaplin | 6 June 1997 |
As the drovers cross the River Wye they face extortionate tolls and it looks as though they may not get any further. To try and raise some money Handi is tempted to join in a card game at the local pub. In desperation he stakes the whole herd in a final gamble. Elizabeth and Aaron are thrown together and she tries to win his approval and admiration.
| 3 | "Episode 3" | Lesley Manning | Michael Chaplin | 13 June 1997 |
The herd falls foul of disease which creates tension between the men. Ruth's husband returns after fourteen years and there is a harrowing family reunion. Elizabeth gets the men to visit her uncle Sir Thomas, who will cure the cattle of the contagion. Whilst at his house, Aaron and Elizabeth start their love affair, but they are held in check by the barrier of the gap in their class and the sudden arrival of Sir Huw.
| 4 | "Episode 4" | Lesley Manning | Michael Chaplin | 20 June 1997 |
Aaron and Armstrong are broken hearted about being separated from their loved ones. They are staying at an erode inn and Moc is haunted by a ghostly premonition. Handl ignores a cholera warning outbreak and visits a nearby town to see an old flame Isobel who is now the wife of a local doctor. Handl leaving the others to cope with the herd. He is disturbed by witnessing the horrific effects of cholera and helps them in an illegal but pioneering way. Moc gets involved in a fight with Vaughan, Daniel re-appears and fights Vaughan off and Aaron and Daniel come face to face as father and son.
| 5 | "Episode 5" | Lesley Manning | Michael Chaplin | 27 June 1997 |
The drove finally arrives in London and they herd the beasts to pens, helped by a friendly guide. However, the latter is in the pay of Vaughan and he leads the men off to a seedy drinking den. Coincidentally Mary and Rebecca have just started work with the owner of the den, and they help Aaron to escape after a fight breaks out and the police arrive, arresting Daniel, Handl, and Armstrong. Meanwhile, Dafydd, who was left guarding the animals, is lured away by a young girl and kidnapped, although he later manages to escape from his captors. Aaron is badly beaten up at Vaughan's instigation and the cattle are stolen. Elizabeth discovers the plot between her father and Vaughan and threatens the former into releasing those in jail and giving them the money from the sold cattle. She plans to go away with Aaron, but in an accident partially caused by Dafydd, her father is badly injured and by the time she reaches the rendezvous Aaron has left. He is accompanied back to Wales by his father. Armstrong purchases a blacksmith's shop in London and Mary and Rebecca go to live with him. A violent encounter with Vaughan leads to his death, and the two return home where Daniel and Ruth are reconciled.

== Home media ==
The series has yet to be released on DVD or VHS.

== See also ==
- List of Welsh television series
