= Rae Hendrie =

Scottish casting director (born 1976)

Rae Hendrie (born 30 November 1976) is a Scottish casting director and former actress. As an actress, she was known for her role as Jess Mackenzie in the BBC TV series Monarch of the Glen.

As a child, she sang in classical concerts. She later sang in her role on Monarch of the Glen. Prior to being cast in Monarch, Rae was a London classroom assistant working with children with special education needs. She also appeared in an episode of Taggart in 2002, playing Sadie McPhail, and in 2006 had a role in EastEnders playing Briony Campbell.

Hendrie has worked for more than a decade as a casting director, across projects such as Hotel Portofino, Bookish, The Couple Next Door, Moonflower Murders, Suspect, Patience, Trigger Point and Industry (for which she shared the 2021 RTS Award for Best Casting with Julie Harkin).

== Filmography as actor ==
- EastEnders playing Briony Campbell, 2006
- Sea of Souls playing Shiela, 2006
- Meet the Magoons playing Selina, 2005
- Murphy's Law playing Gina, 2005
- Holby City playing Lizzie Hart, 2005
- The Bill playing Tara, 2003
- Taggart playing Sadie McPhail, 2002
- Rockface playing Nurse Jo, 2002, 2003
- Monarch of the Glen, 2001-2005
