= Lorraine Pilkington =

Irish actress

- Born: 18 April 1974 (age 52); Dublin, Ireland
- Occupation: Actress
- Years active: 1990–present
- Spouse: Simon Massey (m. 2001)
- Children: 3

Lorraine Pilkington (born 18 April 1974) is an Irish actress from Dublin who is best known for her roles as Katrina Finlay from Monarch of the Glen and Lulu in Human Traffic.

== Early life and education ==
Born in Dublin in 1974, one of four children, Pilkington grew up in the affluent suburban village of Malahide, and attended Manor House School, Raheny until the age of 15. She trained at the Gaiety School of Acting.

== Career ==
Pilkington began her acting career at the age of 15 when she appeared in The Miracle directed by Neil Jordan. She appeared onstage in the plays The Plough and the Stars and The Iceman Cometh. At age 18 she moved to London where she was given a part in a Miramax film which eventually fell through after a meeting with Harvey Weinstein. She later returned to Dublin, living in Ballsbridge for a time.

After a period involving substantial voiceover work, she moved back to London in the late 1990s, with the self-described aim of relaunching her career. Pilkington subsequently appeared in films including Human Traffic and My Kingdom, a retelling of King Lear. In 1999, she was cast as Katrina Finlay, a schoolteacher in a Scottish village, a major role in the BBC television series Monarch of the Glen, which was broadcast from 2000. After leaving the show at the beginning of the third season, she appeared in various other television productions such as Rough Diamond and Outnumbered.

In 2008, she appeared in a short film by Luke Massey Within the Woods, with James Chalmers. In 2016 she voiced the lead role in a Paramount animated film Capture the Flag.

=== Filmography ===
- 1991 The Miracle
- 1994 All Things Bright and Beautiful (direct to TV)
- 1996 The Last of the High Kings
- 1997 The Boxer
- 1998 The Nephew
- 1999 Human Traffic
- 2001 My Kingdom
- 2004 Rabbit on the Moon (Conejo en la Luna, Mexico)
- 2006 After Thomas
- 2006 In a Day
- 2008 Within the Woods (short film)
- 2012 What Richard Did
- 2016 Capture the Flag (voice role)

=== Television ===
- 2000 Monarch of the Glen as Katrina Finlay
- 2003 The Clinic on RTÉ One
- 2003 Waking the Dead episode "Walking on Water" as Mandy Lovell
- 2005 Robotboy on Cartoon Network as Tommy Turnbull, Debbie Turnbull, and Computer Teacher
- 2007 Rough Diamond on RTÉ One
- 2008 Britannia High on ITV1 as Anna
- 2008 Outnumbered on BBC1 as Barbara
- 2011 Narrator on Masterchef Ireland on RTÉ Two
- 2016, 2017 & 2019 Casualty on BBC One as Rosa Hide (Nurse David Hide's ex-wife)

=== Stage ===
- 1990s The Plough and the Stars and The Iceman Cometh
- 1999 Trust (Gary Mitchell), Royal Court Theatre, London
- 2015 When we were women (Orange Tree Theatre)

== Personal life ==
In late 2001, in Wicklow, Pilkington married Simon Massey. They originally met on the set of Ballykissangel in 1999, and he was later director of Monarch of the Glen. She has three sons with Massey, and two step-children from his previous marriage.
