= Karen Westwood =

Scottish actress

Karen Westwood is a Scottish actress most famous for her role as Meg Paterson in BBC TV series Monarch of the Glen. She also played Rebecca Bannerman in Families, Isabella Woodhouse in Emma and Carolyn Fraser in Two Thousand Acres of Sky. In Doctor Who she played Tabetha Pond, Amy Pond's mother, appearing on screen in The Big Bang after being mentioned from time to time throughout the series but supposed dead. She made an appearance in the first episode of You Rang, M'Lord? as a maid who was dismissed from service by Lord Meldrum after having been made pregnant by his brother Teddy. One of her earlier roles is that of Janie Ross in an episode of Taggart, Flesh and Blood (1989).
