= Hamish Clark =

Scottish actor and entertainer (born 1965)

- Born: Hamish Clark; 26 July 1965 (age 61); Broughty Ferry, Dundee, Scotland
- Education: University of Edinburgh, Royal Welsh College of Music & Drama
- Occupation: Actor

Hamish Clark (born 26 July 1965) is a Scottish actor and entertainer. He has performed as a supporting actor on stage, film, television and radio. Clark is best known as the kilt-wearing Duncan McKay in the BBC TV series Monarch of the Glen which was set entirely in Scotland.

After growing up in Broughty Ferry, Dundee, Clark attended the University of Edinburgh. While at university he studied English literature and performed with the Edinburgh University Theatre Company and the Edinburgh Festival Fringe. He later attended the Welsh College of Music & Drama in Cardiff studying drama as a postgraduate. Before becoming a professional actor, he worked as a clerk in an Edinburgh insurance company. Clark moved to London in 1995 where he pursued a full time career in acting in both dramatic and comic roles and in 1999 was cast as Duncan McKay in Monarch of the Glen. Clark is well recognizable as the face of various advertising campaigns such as that for Vodafone and Budget Direct. In May 2002 he opened the Strathspey Railway's extension to Broomhill which had previously been used as Glenbogle Railway Station in Monarch of the Glen.

== Filmography ==
- Holby City (TV Series, 2009–2022) as Ken Davies (various episodes)
- White Island (Motion Picture, 2016) as Stuart
- Arrested Development (2013) (TV series) as Band Leader (episode 4)
- Liz & Dick (TV Movie) (2012) Alan Williams (uncredited)
- Rab C. Nesbitt (2011) (TV series) as Simon Bird (season 10, episode 4)
- Time Machine: Rise of the Morlocks (TV Movie) (2012) as Patterson
- The Decoy Bride (Motion picture, 2011) as Angus
- The Hour, guest presenter (between 6–10 July 2009)
- After the Rain (Motion picture, 2006) as Yvan
- Small Fish (2006) (TV series) as Marcus (pilot episode)
- Blessed (2005) (TV series) as The Green Planet Man (episode 3)
- The Only Boy For Me (Motion picture, 2006) as Gary
- Monarch of the Glen (1999) (TV series) as Duncan McKay (Series 1–7) (1999–2005)
- Piggy Bank (1999) (Short film) as Karl
- Martha, Meet Frank, Daniel and Laurence a.k.a. The Very Thought of You (1998) as Sven
- Sentimental Education (Motion picture, 1998) as Rufus
- Bring Me the Head of Mavis Davis (Motion picture, 1997) as John (TV Reporter)
- My Wonderful Life (1997-1999) (TV series) as Roger Graham
- Doctor Who (various character voices) (Audio Series)

== Theatre ==
- The Albatross 3rd & Main (2017) by Simon David Eden at The Park Theatre (London), London as Gene
- The Agent (2007) by Martin Wagner at The Old Red Lion Theatre, London as Alexander
- Donkeys' Years (2006) by Michael Frayn at the Comedy Theatre, London as Quine
- Phallacy (2005) by Carl Djerassi at New End Theatre, Hampstead as Otto

== Other media ==
- Dixon of Dock Green (Dramatised radio series – BBC Radio 2008) as Andy Crawford
- The Last Vampire by Willis Hall (Talking Book – BBC Radio Big Toe Books series 2009)
- The Royal Game (Talking book – BBC Radio 2011)

== Advertisements ==
- Budget Direct – Insurance Solved (Australia) as Detective Sarge in a TV advertising and print media campaign
- Historic Scotland (2010) TV advertising
- Speak Up For Broadband Highlands & Islands of Scotland Regional development board (2003), TV advertising
- Vodafone (UK) (1998–2001), TV advertising & printed media advertising campaign
- Brand brewery a subsidiary of Heineken (Dutch) (TV advertising, 1999)

== Personal life ==
Clark was brought up in the Broughty Ferry area of Dundee, at some remove from his great-great-grandfather, a shipwright and his wife was a jute-mill worker. His ancestors worked on an orchard near Perth.
