= Michael Chaplin (writer) =

English writer and producer (born 1951)

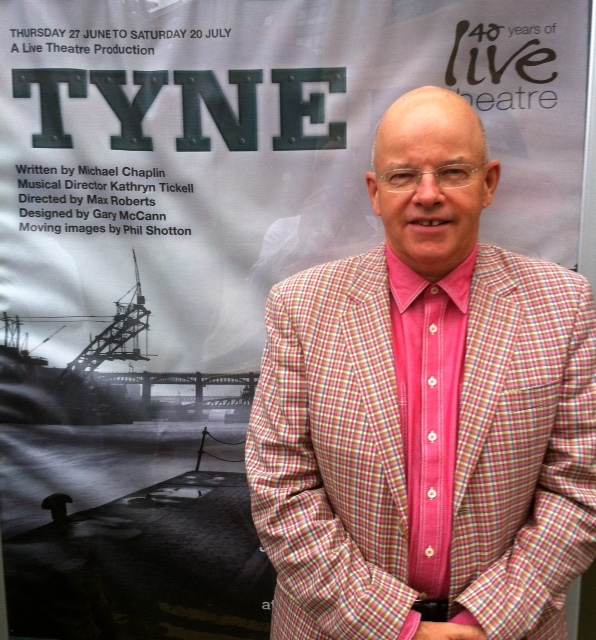
- Writer Michael Chaplin outside the Live Theatre, Newcastle upon Tyne for his play Tyne
- Born: 1951 (age 74–75); County Durham
- Education: Heaton Grammar School, Newcastle upon Tyne
- Alma mater: Magdalene College, University of Cambridge
- Occupation: Writer
- Relatives: Sid Chaplin (father)

Michael Chaplin (born 1951 in County Durham) is an English theatre, radio, television and non-fiction writer and former television producer and executive. He grew up in Newcastle upon Tyne where he now lives.

== Life ==
Chaplin attended Heaton Grammar School in Newcastle, followed by Magdalene College, Cambridge, where he read history. After graduating from Cambridge in 1973, he trained as a reporter on The Journal newspaper in Newcastle upon Tyne, and then became the paper's health correspondent.

In 1977, he moved to London, becoming successively a researcher, producer, director and executive producer in London Weekend Television's current affairs and documentaries department. Among his credits there was as editor of the arts/lifestyle show South of Watford. He then produced the ITV drama series Wish Me Luck about women secret agents in France during World War II which aired on ITV between 1988 and 1990.

In 1989, he became head of drama and arts at ITV Tyne Tees and was executive producer of the early Catherine Cookson adaptations.

In 1991, Chaplin moved to BBC Wales as head of programmes. By this time, Chaplin had begun to write for the Live Theatre Company, a new writing company in Newcastle upon Tyne, collaborating with Alan Plater on In Blackberry Time (1987–8), a play about the life and work of his late father, Sid Chaplin.

His first credit on television was the ITV mini-series Act of Betrayal about an IRA super-grass on the run in Australia, co-written with his friend and former LWT colleague Nicholas Evans. His first radio writing credit was Hair In The Gate (1990) for BBC Radio 4, based on a play of the same name staged at Live Theatre the year before.

In 1994, having completed the ITV mini-series Dandelion Dead about the poisoner Herbert Rowse Armstrong, Chaplin became a full-time writer.

In TV, he has created the original series Grafters (1998–9) for ITV; and for the BBC Drovers' Gold (1997) about a group of Welsh cattle drovers in the 19th century; and then Monarch of the Glen (2000–2006); the series ran for 69 episodes and has been screened in many countries around the world.

Chaplin adapted novels by the crime writer Reginald Hill for four films in the BBC series Dalziel and Pascoe (one of these, On Beulah Height, won an Edgar Award from the Mystery Writers of America); and P. D. James's Original Sin as an ITV mini-series.

Other TV work includes the ITV drama screened in 2006 – Pickles - The Dog Who Won The World Cup - and the TV adaption of Michelle Magorian's novel Just Henry, screened in 2011. Chaplin worked on the BBC series Robin Hood and the ITV series Wild at Heart.

Chaplin's radio work for BBC Radio 4 includes single plays like Hair In The Gate (1990), One-Way Ticket to Palookaville (1992), and The Song Thief (2008), later adapted for the People's Theatre, Newcastle upon Tyne, in 2011. There were also seven contributions to The Stanley Baker Baxter Playhouse: "Flying Down to Greenock", "Fife Circle" and "A Dish of Neapolitan", "The Pool" and "Melancholy Baby". Chaplin created and wrote all 13 plays in the series Two Pipe Problems (2006–2013) about life in a retirement home for faded theatricals with a Sherlock Holmes trope.

Since returning to Newcastle in 2006 with his wife Susan Chaplin, a silversmith and teacher, Chaplin has written various books of non-fiction about the culture of the region, including Come and See (2011), about Tyneside Cinema. In 2013, Tyne View - A Walk Around the Port of Tyne was published, with contributions from artist Birtley Aris, photographer Charles Bell and poet Christy Ducker. Chaplin has contributed twenty story panels based on South Tyneside's maritime history to South Shields' library and resource centre, The Word. Chaplin has also edited two collections of the work of his father Sid Chaplin: In Blackberry Time published by Bloodaxe Books in 1987, and Hame – My Durham published by Mayfly Books in 2016 to mark the birth centenary of the author.

Since writing his first stage play In Blackberry Time in 1987 (drawn from the book of the same name), Chaplin has written seven other full-length plays and sundry other shorter pieces for the Live Theatre. These include two plays written with his son Tom about the travails of their football club Newcastle United, You Couldn't Make It Up and You Really Couldn't Make It Up (2009); A Walk-On Part, a dramatisation of the best-selling diaries of Chris Mullin MP, which also ran at the Soho Theatre and then the Arts Theatre, London (2011–12), and then the play with music Tyne based on Chaplin's book Tyne View, which enjoyed a sell-out run at the Live, before proving equally popular at the Customs House, South Shields and then the Theatre Royal, Newcastle (2013–14). Almost all of Chaplin's plays for the Live Theatre were directed by Max Roberts, the theatre's artistic director for more than 30 years.

Chaplin also worked as a co-writer of Tommies, a four-year project for BBC Radio 4 telling the story of the First World War from the point of view of a group of British Army signallers. The series ran from the autumn of 2014 until November 2018, with Chaplin writing a total of eight episodes.

In January 2015, Radio 4 began broadcasting a series of 13 plays by Chaplin with the generic title The Ferryhill Philosophers about the collision between moral philosophy and life in the small town in County Durham where Chaplin spent the first three years of his life. The series, starring Alun Armstrong as retired pitman Joe Snowball and Deborah Findlay as Durham University philosophy lecturer Hermione Pink, ran for 13 plays. One of these plays, Lies, Damn Lies and Conversational Implicature, was performed live with the help of the Ferryhill Town Band at the Durham Book Festival in October 2016.

For The Love of Leo, a comedy drama starring Mark Bonnar and set in Edinburgh (where Chaplin and wife Susan lived for five years), began running on Radio 4 in 2019 and was recommissioned for a further two series.

In 2020, Chaplin wrote a 60-minute single play for Radio 4. titled South On The Great North Road shaped around a song of the same name by Sting). The playwright and singer/songwriter then collaborated on a 90-minute play with songs about the life of a musical life of a Newcastle family which went out in March 2022. Sting played one of the characters in I Must Have Loved You, as well as singing.

In August 2021, Chaplin published a memoir framed around one of his lifetime obsessions: Newcastle United Stole My Heart: 60 Years in Black And White was published by Hurst Books and received much praise from fans, ex-players and sports journalists.

Chaplin was a visiting professor at both Sunderland University (2007–2012) and Newcastle University (2016–2021). He was a writer-in-residence for the Port of Tyne from 2010 to 2015 and has served on the boards of various cultural organisations in the North-East, including the Live Theatre, the Tyneside Cinema, the writers’ development agency New Writing North and the Amber/Side Trust.
