= Kinloch Laggan =

Coordinates: 56.97355°N 4.4035°W

Kinloch Laggan: Scottish Gaelic: Ceann Loch Lagain
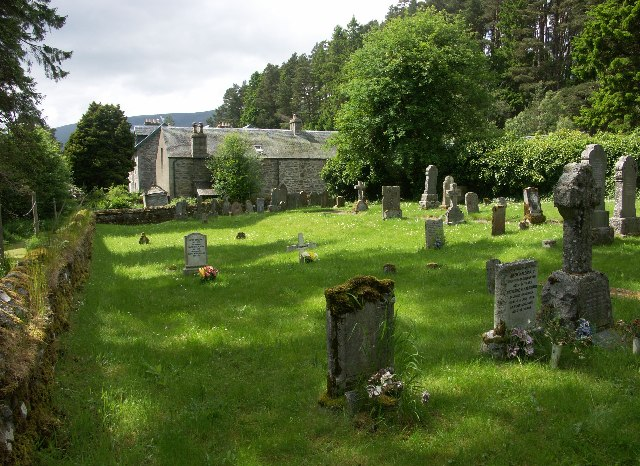
- Old church dedicated to St. Kenneth of Aghabo, a distinguished Irish Pict.

- Location within the Badenoch and Strathspey area
- OS grid reference: NN540894
- Council area: Highland
- Country: Scotland
- Sovereign state: United Kingdom
- Post town: Newtonmore
- Postcode district: PH20
- Police: Scotland
- Fire: Scottish
- Ambulance: Scottish

Kinloch Laggan (Scottish Gaelic: Ceann Loch Lagain) is a hamlet located at the head of Loch Laggan in Inverness-shire, Scottish Highlands and is in the Scottish council area of Highland. The village is situated 12 miles (19 kilometres) southwest of Newtonmore.

The area is historically tied to the Clan Macpherson, their participation in the 1745 Jacobite uprising, and the leasing of their historic estates for Victorian sporting.
