= Monarch of the Glen (TV series) =

British television drama series (2000–2005)

- Genre: Comedy drama
- Created by: Michael Chaplin
- Starring: Alastair Mackenzie; Dawn Steele; Susan Hampshire; Lloyd Owen; Richard Briers; Alexander Morton; Hamish Clark; Julian Fellowes; Lorraine Pilkington; Martin Compston; Rae Hendrie; Tom Baker; Hermione Gulliford
- Theme music composer: Simon Brint with Kenny G
- Country of origin: United Kingdom
- Original language: English
- No. of series: 7
- No. of episodes: 64 (list of episodes)

Production
- Executive producers: Barbara McKissack; Douglas Rae; Victoria Evans; Robert Bernstein; Gaynor Holmes
- Running time: 50 min. (series 1–3); 60 min. (series 4–7)

Original release
- Network: BBC One
- Release: 27 February 2000 – 23 October 2005

Monarch of the Glen is a British comedy drama television series produced by Ecosse Films for BBC Scotland and broadcast on BBC One for seven series between February 2000 and October 2005 with 64 episodes in total.

The first five series of Monarch of the Glen told the story of young restaurateur Archie MacDonald trying to restore his childhood home in the Scottish Highlands, starring Alastair Mackenzie, Richard Briers, Susan Hampshire and Dawn Steele. The final two series focussed on new Laird Paul Bowman trying to modernise the estate, primarily starring Lloyd Owen, Tom Baker, Alexander Morton and Susan Hampshire.

The series is loosely based on Compton Mackenzie's Highland Novels, which are set in the same location but in the 1930s and 1940s. The first book in that series is called The Monarch of the Glen, which was a reference to the famous painting of the same name by Landseer.

The series was created by Michael Chaplin and produced by Nick Pitt, Paddy Higson, Jeremy Gwilt, Stephen Garwood and Rob Bullock. The show saw many directors, most notably Edward Bennett, Richard Signy, Rick Stroud and Robert Knights; and many writers including Chaplin, Niall Leonard, John Martin Johnson, Leslie Stewart and Jeremy Front. Filming took between six and eight months per series in the Badenoch and Strathspey area of the Scottish Highlands, in particular at Ardverikie House, which was the location for the fictional "Glenbogle House".

In September 2023, the series was made permanently available on BBC iPlayer.

On April 30, 2026 it was announced that PBS Masterpiece will co-produce a re-imagining of the original series, in a new six episode series. Jeremy Brock created the new series, and is set to executive produce.

== Series synopses ==
=== Series 1 ===
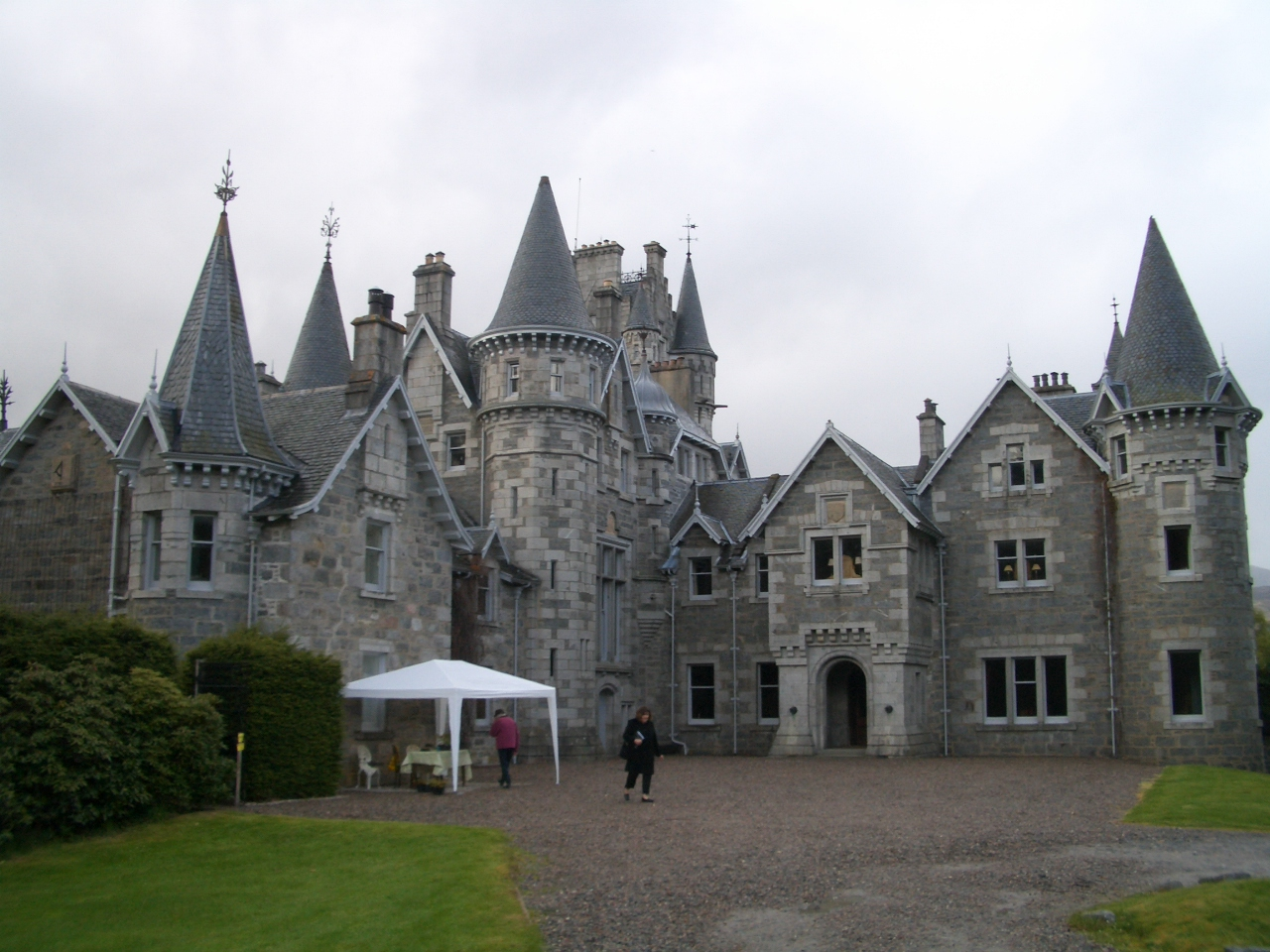
Ardverikie House depicts Glenbogle House in Monarch of the Glen.

While trying to carve a living out of the London restaurant he runs with his girlfriend Justine, Archie MacDonald is called back to his Highland home, as his father Hector is dying. When he arrives, he finds that the news was a ploy by his mother, Molly, to get him to Scotland. He learns he has inherited his father's title and estate, Laird of Glenbogle. Archie faces a tough decision: whether to help the debt-ridden Glenbogle or to return to Justine in London. Archie meets the local school headteacher, Katrina Finlay, with whom he begins a complicated friendship. The feisty staff of Glenbogle—Lexie, Golly and Duncan—also prove hard to handle. Archie negotiates a deal with the bank and tries to find ways out of debt. Pressured by Justine to return to London, he decides to sell his share in the London restaurant and stay on at Glenbogle. Justine relents and decides to join Archie.

=== Series 2 ===
After his split with Justine, Archie finally knows where his future lies—at Glenbogle. Developing a relationship with Katrina, Archie faces obstacles: with his new Head Ranger, Fergal MacClure who is also attracted to Katrina, and with Lexie, who has her eye on the Laird. Hector and Molly face problems as their daughter Lizzie comes, apparently pregnant, to Glenbogle with her healer boyfriend and his acolytes. Hector visits an old flame to try to get the trails on the estate approved by the local council. Golly faces a battle with Fergal to keep Duncan as his friend and assistant because Duncan is very taken with outward bounds activities over the fieldsport traditions of the estate and Fergal's charismatic enthusiasm. Fergal falls for Katrina but is offered a job in New Zealand when his work establishing the trails at Glenbogle ends. He asks Katrina to go with him, and she leaves because Archie will not state his love for her. Archie chases her train but discovers from Fergal that she has already disembarked. He finds her on the estate and they kiss.

=== Series 3 ===
Glenbogle's debts are mounting, and the bank, Lascelles, sends Stella Moon to take over the estate as financial controller. The hard and stubborn Stella proves difficult to handle, though she has her eye on Archie, now unattached again, as Katrina has taken up the offer of a career in national politics following her success on the local Council. Duncan also faces romantic problems. Molly is upset that Hector is spending more time with his chum Kilwillie than with her. Golly is reunited with his daughter after many years (he had wanted to marry her mother, but she had left him). Local entrepreneur Stuart McIntosh tries to take land from under the MacDonalds' feet. The estate is now turning a profit and Stella is offered a job in South America provided the estate passes inspection by the bank's chief at the Midsummer's Ball. Stella tries to sabotage the event in an attempt to stay at Glenbogle with Archie, but she fails. The bank's chair returns control of the estate to Archie, who realises he is in love with Lexie, and proposes to her in the kitchen. Initially, Lexie says no but then changes into a red ball dress and meets Archie on the terrace and says yes. The engagement causes friction between Archie and Hector, who disapproves of the match because he fears Lexie may feel trapped on the estate and leave Archie—as Molly once left him. This information is never relayed to Archie, because Hector dies suddenly. Lexie wants to delay the wedding as it is mere weeks after the funeral but Archie insists it go ahead. Lexie runs off. Archie and the estate team track her down and he agrees they should postpone their marriage.

=== Series 4 ===
Lexie struggles to become the new Lady of Glenbogle after her marriage to Archie, but tries to continue some of her old duties, especially cooking. When Archie hires a new cook, Lexie becomes upset and jealous, and insists on a cook-off, using an old, relatively unknown Scottish recipe. She does not know that the new cook, Irene, has been the chef of a large Highland hotel, and that this particular recipe was one of her specialities. Molly tries to come to terms with being a widow after Hector's death and finds she has a suitor in the shape of new neighbour, Andrew. When Paul Bowman-MacDonald suddenly turns up, Archie and his mother Molly are shocked and upset to learn that his father once had an affair, and that Paul was the child produced. They also discover that he is AWOL from the British Army. Molly tries to be welcoming to Paul, realising that being illegitimate is not his fault, and that he was not aware of his parentage until his mother's death. Still, she feels betrayed. Golly is devastated to find that Duncan is romantically involved with new cook, Irene, but Duncan is horrified to find that Irene is pregnant by the husband she has run away from. Archie must deal with his father's astronomical death duties. Lexie's mother offers to pay these off as a wedding gift but Lexie refuses out of pride. Briefly, Molly considers marrying Killwillie to get them out of the financial hole, but money is found at the last minute.

=== Series 5 ===
Glenbogle's financial problems are over, and Archie starts to become bored. Looking for a new challenge he considers running a restaurant owned by Kilwillie—in New York. Lexie is not keen. Paul returns to Glenbogle to start afresh but is treated badly. He wants to start an Outward Bound centre on the estate but the locals do not want city youths visiting. A compromise is eventually found when Lexie suggests they offer first turn at the new activity centre to local youth. Molly wonders whether she is in love after her relationship with Andrew starts to blossom. Golly's daughter, Jess, comes to live in Glenbogle. Duncan finds a new girlfriend in Kilwillie's niece Hermione, but she is very bossy. Lexie wonders whether she has what it takes to be Laird after Archie leaves Glenbogle to go mountain climbing in Nepal with his sister Lizzie in honour of their late father. After Duncan discovers that Hermione hid the contents of a job acceptance letter from him, he ends the relationship. He and Jess begin a friendship that leads to a more serious relationship. When Molly discovers that Andrew has proposed to many women and painted them all wearing his mother's engagement ring, she realises she cannot trust him. She takes a holiday and, when she returns, her long friendship with Golly—dating to the earliest years of her marriage—takes a turn in a new direction.

=== Series 6 ===
Paul becomes Laird of Glenbogle after Lexie and Archie move to New Zealand, but he falls in love with Lexie when she comes back to Glenbogle temporarily. Ewan, who has joined the estate as cook, sets up a pirate radio station in the glen. He forms a friendship with Archie's and Paul's uncle Donald, who comes back to his childhood home under a curfew order. Clearly, there is bad feeling between Molly and Donald. It later emerges that he had propositioned her whilst she was married and when she refused to run off with him, he left the estate—and his brother—never to speak to Hector again. Molly is not forthcoming with Golly and when Jess sets her father up, Golly falls in love with new dancing teacher, Meg. He wonders whether he is too old to have a relationship with her but they appear to enjoy one another. Duncan starts the series about to propose to Jess, but is discouraged from this by her comments. He later finds a talent for radio via Ewan's programme, but to get more experience decides to apply for a job with hospital radio in the city. Jess tries to come to terms with Duncan's departure from the glen. Molly is disconcerted by Golly's new relationship and backs away. Paul tries to persuade Lexie to stay at Glenbogle with him, but despite their attraction, Lexie takes Molly's advice—and the story of Hector and Donald's parting to heart. She leaves for New Zealand to join Archie. A city-worker-turned-farmer, Isobel, arrives, and her problems distract Paul.

=== Series 7 ===
Paul becomes close to a local shepherdess, Iona McLean, but his romantic dreams are temporarily dashed when Iona's former fiancé arrives in the glen. Ewan wonders whether to stay with girlfriend, Zoe, when he takes a shine to Paul's goddaughter, Amy. Molly becomes a mother-like figure to Golly's new son, Cameron, after the death of Meg (who never regained consciousness after giving birth). Jess tries to prove herself to her father when she starts to feel that Golly does not care about her. Donald wonders whether to go to a retirement home when he starts to feel his age. Glenbogle is threatened with closure after Paul realises that the financial problems that once plagued the estate are slowly returning. The village community buys Glenbogle allowing the MacDonalds to remain in the house Paul marries Iona At the end of the show, the main characters each have a romantic partner and they take a photograph: Paul and Iona; Molly and Golly; Jess and Duncan; Ewan and Amy; Donald and a woman from the retirement home; and Kilwillie and the female minister. Hector appears as a ghost, talks to Molly, and witnesses these events.

== Cast ==
=== Regular cast ===
The following is a list of the regular cast of Monarch of the Glen who were credited in the opening credits of the show (in appearance order).

Actor	Character	Series	Recurring	No. of episodes (/64)
Richard Briers	Hector MacDonald	Series 1–3	Series 7	28
Susan Hampshire	Molly MacDonald	Series 1–7		59
Alastair Mackenzie	Archie MacDonald	Series 1–5		43
Lorraine Pilkington	Katrina Finlay	Series 1–2	Series 3–4	18
Alexander Morton	Golly Mackenzie	Series 1–7		64
Dawn Steele	Lexie MacDonald	Series 1–6		51
Hamish Clark	Duncan McKay	Series 1–6	Series 7	53
Julian Fellowes	Lord Kilwillie	Series 3–4	Series 1–2, 5, 7	24
Alexandra Gilbreath	Stella Moon	Series 3		9
Rebecca Lacey	Irene Stuart	Series 4		8
Lloyd Owen	Paul Bowman-MacDonald	Series 5–7	Series 4	28
Simone Lahbib	Isobel Anderson	Series 6		10
Martin Compston	Ewan Brodie	Series 6–7	Series 5	20
Rae Hendrie	Jess Mackenzie	Series 5–7	Series 3	25
Tom Baker	Donald MacDonald	Series 6–7		12
Kirsty Mitchell	Iona McLean	Series 7		6

=== Recurring roles ===
The following is a list, in order of appearance, of actors who were in three or more episodes of Monarch of the Glen as the same character but who were not credited as a regular in the opening titles of the show.

Actor	Character	Series	No. of episodes (/64)
Anna Wilson-Jones	Justine	Series 1–2	6
Carole Cassidy	Maureen MacLean	Series 1–2	4
Simon Slater	Lancelot Fleming	Series 1–2	3
Paul Goodwin	Alan Smythe	Series 1	4
Ralph Riach	Geordie McCann	Series 1–2	2
Jason O'Mara	Fergal MacClure	Series 2	6
Jenny Lee	Liz Logan	Series 3–5	4
Gavin Mitchell	PC Callum McIntyre	Series 3, 5–6	8
Angus Lennie	Badger	Series 4–5	4
Paul Freeman	Andrew Booth	Series 4–5	11
Richenda Carey	Lady Dorothy Trumpington-Bonnet	Series 5	5
Hermione Gulliford	Hermione Trumpington-Bonnet	Series 5	4
John Yule	Dougal Raeburn	Series 5–6	3
Sara Stewart	Amanda MacLeish	Series 5	3
Donald Douglas	Dr. Gordon McKendrick	Series 6–7	3
Kari Corbett	Zoe	Series 6–7	6
Karen Westwood	Meg Paterson	Series 6	5
Lucy Akhurst	Lucy Ford	Series 6	4
Anthony Head	Chester Grant	Series 6	4
Rhianna and Katelyn Duff	Cameron Mackenzie	Series 7	5
Antony Strachan	Frank	Series 7	4

== Locations ==
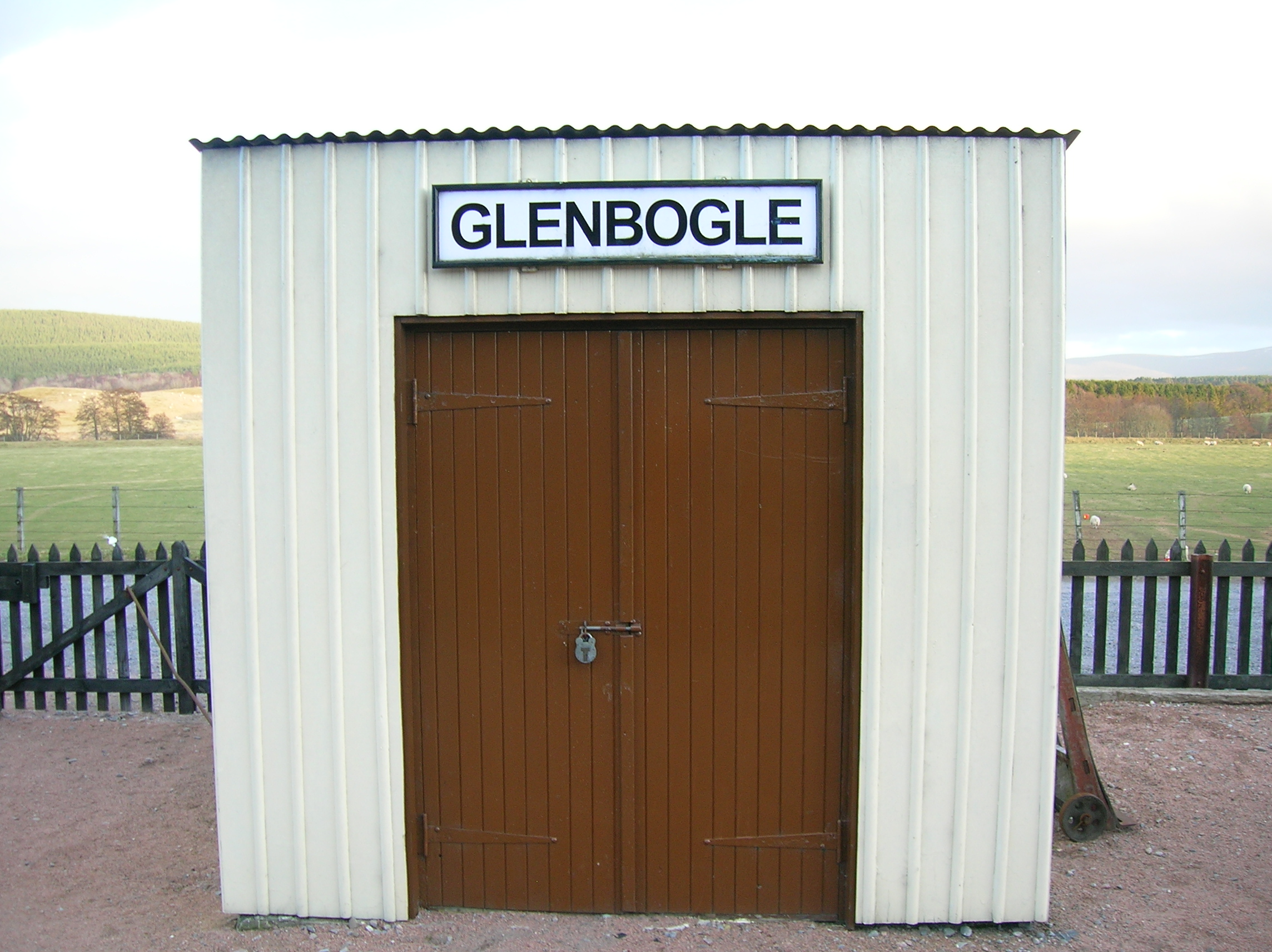
Glenbogle station sign at Broomhill.

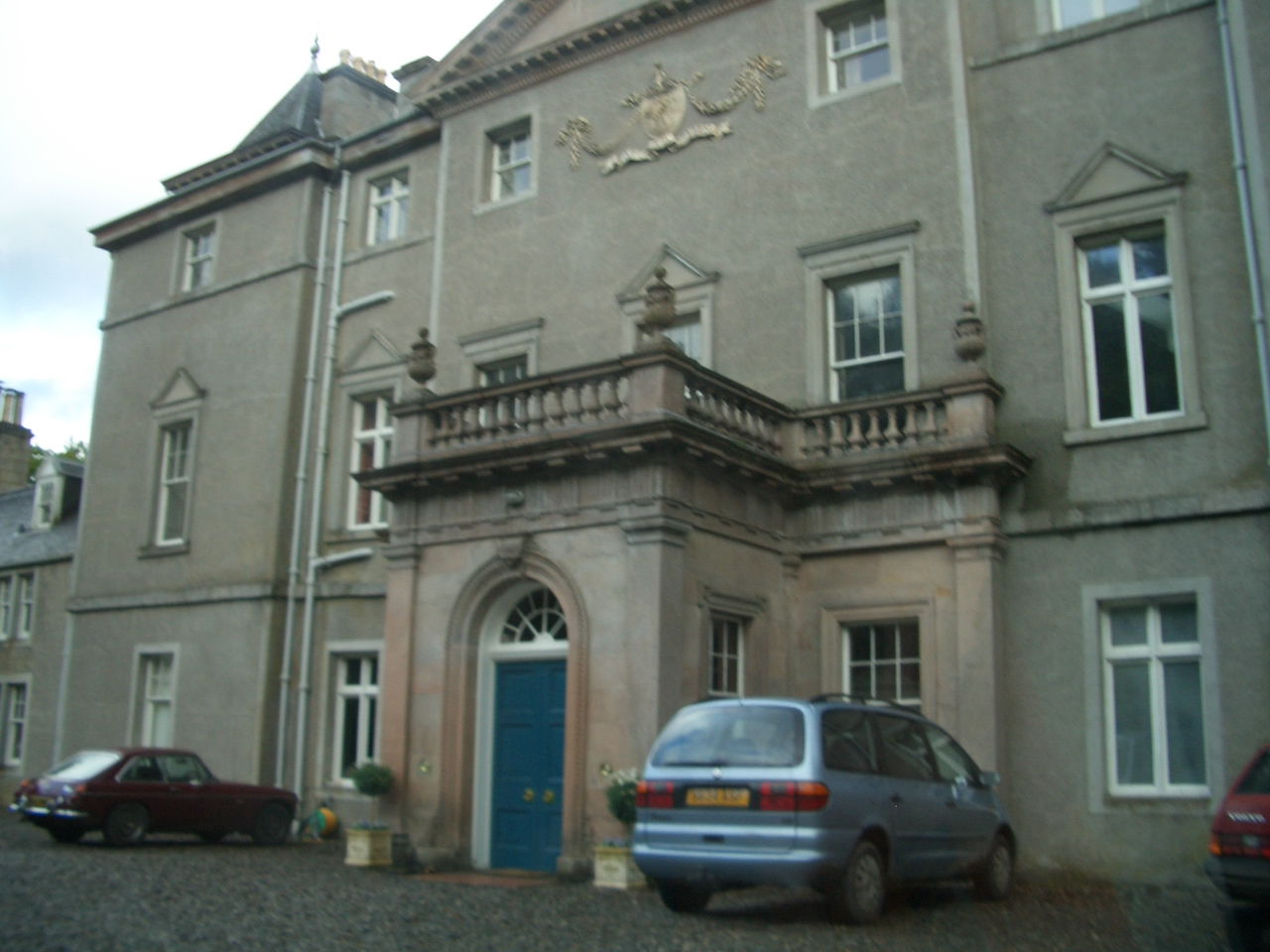
Balavil House which was used as Kilwillie Castle

While the fictional Glenbogle estate in Compton Mackenzie's Highland novels place the estate near Ben Nevis, the series is filmed in and around the Cairngorms, Badenoch and Strathspey, with Ben Nevis replaced by the fictional Ben Bogle.

Ardverikie House, designed by John Rhind in 1870 and built in the Scottish baronial style, depicts Glenbogle Castle in Monarch of the Glen, while location filming took place in Kingussie and Laggan and scenes involving the loch use Loch Laggan. The majority of the programme was filmed on and around the Ardverikie Estate situated on the south-east bank of Loch Laggan. Glenbogle Station was filmed at Broomhill railway station, near Nethy Bridge. This station is the terminus of the Strathspey Railway, a restored steam railway.

The River Pattack just up from the Ardverikie Estate was used several times. Glenbogle Church is the Cille Choirille Church near Roy Bridge. Lord Kilwillie's Castle is Balavil House, off the A9 road 2 miles north-east of Kingussie.

== Broadcast history ==
Seven series were filmed, totaling 64 episodes (including a Hogmanay Special). The series was broadcast internationally in the USA (BBC America and PBS), Australia (ABC), Canada (BBC Canada), Norway, Sweden, Hong Kong, New Zealand, France, the Netherlands, Belgium, Vietnam and Dubai. The series is shown to more than 100 countries on BBC Entertainment (formerly BBC Prime), the BBC's 24-hour global entertainment channel, broadcast to Europe, the Middle East and Africa. Publicity in the United States included front-page coverage in the Chicago Tribune. Monarch of the Glen was Australia's most popular BBC drama in 2002 and 2003.

Monarch of the Glen was broadcast in the United Kingdom on Sunday evenings on BBC One, usually at 20.00 GMT. British ratings in the first five series were high, but lowered after the departure of several of the main characters (Archie, Hector, Lexie, Duncan and Katrina). A petition was formed by 21-year-old "Boglie" Emma Richards to ensure that lead character Archie stayed on the show, but it failed when the actor left the show midway through the fifth series.

Ratings hit an all-time low in 2004, and BBC bosses axed the show, but promised that they would bring back many of the cast from earlier series for a fantastic series finale. The seventh and final series saw the return of Richard Briers, Hamish Clark and Julian Fellowes as promised by the BBC, but the reunion did not include Archie or Lexie.

Series	No. of episodes	Episode runtime	Series premiere	Series finale	Average viewers (in millions)	Average share (in percentage)
1	8	50 minutes	27 February 2000	16 April 2000	8.0	26.0
2	8	50 minutes	7 January 2001	25 February 2001	7.6	26.5
3	11	50 minutes	28 October 2001	20 January 2002	6.9	25.7
4	10	60 minutes	1 September 2002	3 November 2002	7.2	29.1
5	10	60 minutes	28 September 2003	30 November 2003	7.2^{§}	Unknown
Hogmanay Special	1	60 minutes	28 December 2003	28 December 2003	6.3	Unknown
6	10	60 minutes	19 September 2004	21 November 2004	5.3	TBA
7	6	60 minutes	18 September 2005	23 October 2005	5.8	TBA

^{§} Unconfirmed.

== DVD releases ==
Monarch of the Glen has been released on DVD in the UK, the Netherlands and USA only on Region 2 and 1, respectively. In the UK, series 1, 2 and 7 were released in one set and series 3–6 in two sets—each set containing two discs. Acorn Media UK produced the original DVDs, but in 2006 a box set featuring all seven series on 22 discs was produced by the BBC themselves. The Acorn Media UK DVDs, featured special features such as an exclusive interview with Susan Hampshire, photo galleries, production notes and filmographies. The BBC box-set only featured a making-of show titled The Last Monarch, which was broadcast on BBC Scotland before the series finale on 23 October 2005. In the Netherlands series 4 to 7 were released in an edited form of 50 minutes per episode instead of the UK version's 60 minutes.

+ Region 4 (Australia) – Series 4,5,6,7 Only available in a Compilation Boxset exclusive to the ABC Shop July 2007.

The USA Region 1 DVDs are produced by BBC Warner.

To date there has been no HD or Blu-ray release.

DVD series	Release dates		
DVD series	Region 2	Region 1	Region 4
Series 1	27 December 2002	16 September 2003	12 November 2003
Series 2	5 May 2003	4 May 2004	3 February 2005
Series 3	6 October 2003	17 May 2005	4 May 2006
Series 4	29 December 2003	16 May 2006	15 April 2010
Series 5	27 December 2004	24 October 2006	Box set only – see above +
Series 6	10 October 2005	15 May 2007	Box set only – see above +
Series 7	3 April 2006	23 October 2007	Box set only – see above +
Series 1-7	24 October 2006	23 October 2007	July 2007 (box set compilation only +)

== French and Saunders sketch ==
In 2002, the series was spoofed in popular BBC television sketch series French and Saunders for their Celebrity Christmas Puddings special and was named "Monarch of the Glum". Alastair Mackenzie himself appeared in his role of Archie. Dawn French appeared as Lexie MacDonald, Jennifer Saunders as Molly MacDonald.

== 'Monarch of the Glen' 2026 Re-imagining ==
On April 30, 2026 it was announced that PBS Masterpiece will co-produce a re-imagining of the original series, in a new six episode series. Jeremy Brock created the new series, and is set to executive produce.

The new series will follow London lawyer Isla Campbell, as she tries to save her Highland family estate, from the financial ruin created by the enormous debt, left to her family, by her father, in the wake of his passing.
