= Blackwater Reservoir =

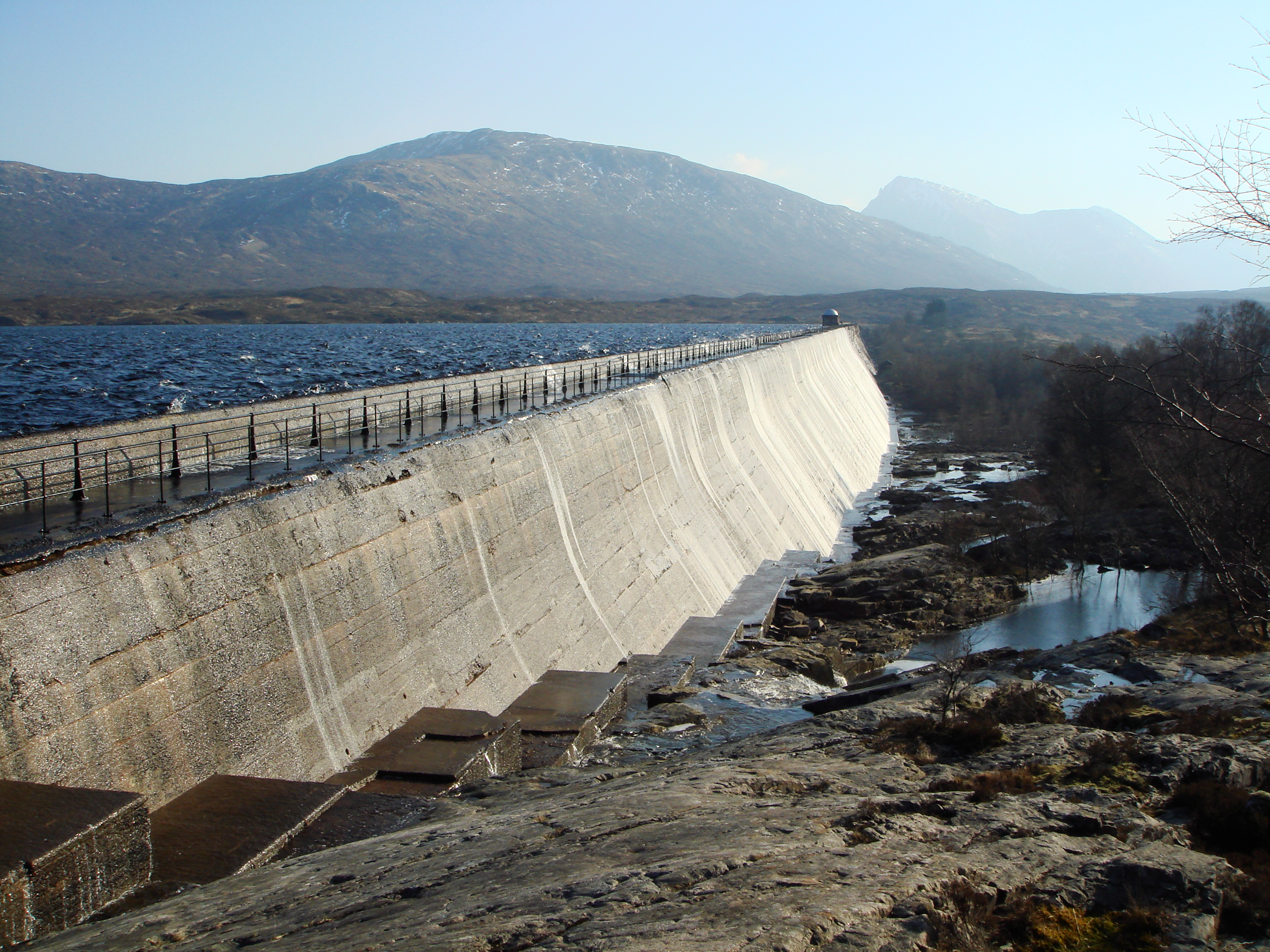

- Location within Highland
- Location: Lochaber, Highland, Scotland
- Coordinates: 56°41′N 4°46′W
- Lake type: Reservoir
- Primary outflows: Black Water
- Basin countries: Scotland
- Surface area: 55 square miles (140 km^{2})
- Surface elevation: 1,068 feet (326 m)

The Blackwater Reservoir is a reservoir created behind a dam in the mountains above Kinlochleven, Lochaber, Highland, Scotland. The dam is 3,112 ft (949 m) long, the longest in the Highlands. The reservoir created is approximately 8 miles (13 km) long, with a drainage basin of about 55 square miles (140 km^{2}). It inundated the Black Water and a chain of three lochs, Lochan Inbhir, Lochan na Sàlach Uidre and Loch a'Bhàillidh.

The dam and reservoir was constructed as part of the Kinlochleven hydroelectric scheme in the early 1900s for the British Aluminium Company for the purpose of smelting aluminium and was designed by engineers Patrick Meik and Charles Meik. Chief assistant resident engineer was William Halcrow. It was the first rock fill embankment dam to be constructed in Scotland.

The 86 ft (26 m) high dam was built at an elevation of about 1,000 ft (300 m) in rugged terrain. The crest level of the dam is at 1,068 ft (326 m). The reservoir has a surface area of 1,091 hectares (2,700 acres), a mean depth of 19.7 m (65 ft), and a volume of almost 215,000,000 cubic metres (7.6×10^{9} cu ft).

== History ==
The Kinlochleven hydroelectric scheme was authorised by the Loch Leven Water Power Acts of 1901 and 1904.

Construction commenced in 1905, and the scheme was completed four years later in 1909. The dam was built using hand tools, without the benefit of mechanical earth moving machinery, and has been described as the last major creation of the traditional 'navvy'. A workforce of 2000 to 3000 people, many were Irish navvies, endured the very wet conditions. In one 24 hour period during construction of the dam, 5.59 inches (142 mm) of rain fell at Kinlochleven, but this didn't damage the dam.

Most of those building the scheme did not know what it was for, instead they called it "the waterworks". A number of these workers lost their lives constructing the dam; their graves, which are marked by concrete markers, are close to the dam. The Navvies' Graveyard is approximately 500 metres (1,600 ft) west of the dam.

6 kilometres (3.7 mi) of concrete aqueduct was constructed contouring around the hillside to above Kinlochleven. Six parallel steel penstock pipelines 39 inches (0.99 m) in diameter then carry the water 935 feet (285 m) down the hillside to the powerhouse.

During the First World War, German prisoners worked on laying an aqueduct 5 miles (8 km) from Loch Eilde Mhor, to expand the production of the scheme, extending the catchment to 66 square miles (170 km^{2}).

The power house and aluminium smelting plant were situated in Kinlochleven, which is adjacent to the sea loch, Loch Leven. The smelter closed in June 2000. The power station now produces electricity for the aluminium smelter in Fort William, supplementing the supply from the Lochaber hydroelectric scheme. Surplus energy is sold to the national grid for public supply.

A small modern hydropower scheme, the River Leven Hydro Scheme, was constructed at the base of the dam in 2021 by Green Highland Renewables.

== See also ==
- List of reservoirs and dams in the United Kingdom
