= Meik =

Meik is a surname. Notable people with the surname include:

- Charles Meik (1853–1923), British civil and mechanical engineer
- Janet Meik Wright, American legal scholar
- Patrick Meik (1851–1910), British civil engineer, brother of Charles and son of Thomas
- Thomas Meik (1812–1896), British engineer
