= George Buchanan (engineer, born 1865) =

British civil engineer

George Cunningham Buchanan
- Buchanan in 1932
- Born: 20 April 1865
- Died: 14 April 1940 (aged 74)
- Engineering career
- Institutions: Institution of Civil Engineers

Sir George Cunningham Buchanan KCIE (20 April 1865 – 14 April 1940) was a British civil engineer particularly associated with harbour works in Burma, Iraq and Bombay, during the early years of the 20th century.

Buchanan first came to prominence in 1905 when he collaborated with Patrick Meik on designs for the Rangoon River training works in Burma; Meik was consulting engineer and Buchanan was chief engineer. The project reclaimed some 1.2 km² of land behind a wall of rubble 2 miles (3.2 km) long and 230 feet (70 m) wide.

At the start of the First World War in 1914, Buchanan was working in India, until called to support the British Mesopotamian Expeditionary Force at Basra in Mesopotamia (now part of modern-day Iraq) with advice on improving shipping channels into the port. After many delays, he was finally able to design and supervise construction of a line of wharves complete with cranes, sheds, roads and railway lines. In 1917, Buchanan was promoted to the rank of brigadier general and was knighted. However, he had already distanced himself from his compatriots by his reputation for egotism and outspokenness, and jealousy of his enormous salary as Director-General of Port Administration and River Conservancy. His military counterpart, General MacMunn, wrote that he: "irritated everyone who came across him or worked for him". Buchanan later wrote a critical book about the military campaign and his own part in turning it around, The Tragedy of Mesopotamia (1938).

Buchanan was a member of the Indian Munitions Board from 1917 – 1919. In 1920, working with Patrick’s brother Charles Meik in a firm renamed CS Meik and Buchanan in 1920, Buchanan was invited to Bombay to investigate a potential land reclamation project, the Bombay Backbay reclamation. The costs of the huge and ambitious scheme, and the time it would take to complete, soon escalated out of control, and a subsequent enquiry blamed Sir George (the project became known as Lloyd’s Folly, after Sir George Lloyd, then governor of Bombay).

At the same time, Sir George Buchanan was alleged to have "criticised and condemned the proposals of another engineer and had offered his services uninvited" – an action which saw him expelled from the British Institution of Civil Engineers. His later career was largely focused overseas, notably in Australia where he prepared an influential report on the country's ports in 1926 at the request of the Federal Government.

His ignominious departure from UK engineering circles meant that the name 'Buchanan' had to be deleted from the company name in 1923 when the firm became CS Meik and Halcrow (William Halcrow had been a partner in the firm from the previous year and went on to take a more controlling interest in what became the Halcrow Group).

Sir George’s nephew, Sir Colin Buchanan was a pioneer in transport planning.

== Bibliography ==
- Description of the Rangoon River Training Works (1914)
- Report on the Development of Mesopotamia (1917)
- Report on the development of the Port of Chittagong., Government Monotype Press, 1918, OCLC 867886824
- The Ports Of India (1920)
- Economics Of Port Administration And Development
- Northern Territory development and administration : report, Victorian Govt. Printer, 1925
- Report on the ports of north and north-western Australia, 30th April 1926, Govt. Printer for the Government of the Commonwealth of Australia, 1926
- Report on transport in Australia with special reference to port and harbour facilities, Govt. Printer, 1927
- The tragedy of Mesopotamia, W. Blackwood, 1938
