= Wandsworth Bridge =

Bridge in London, England

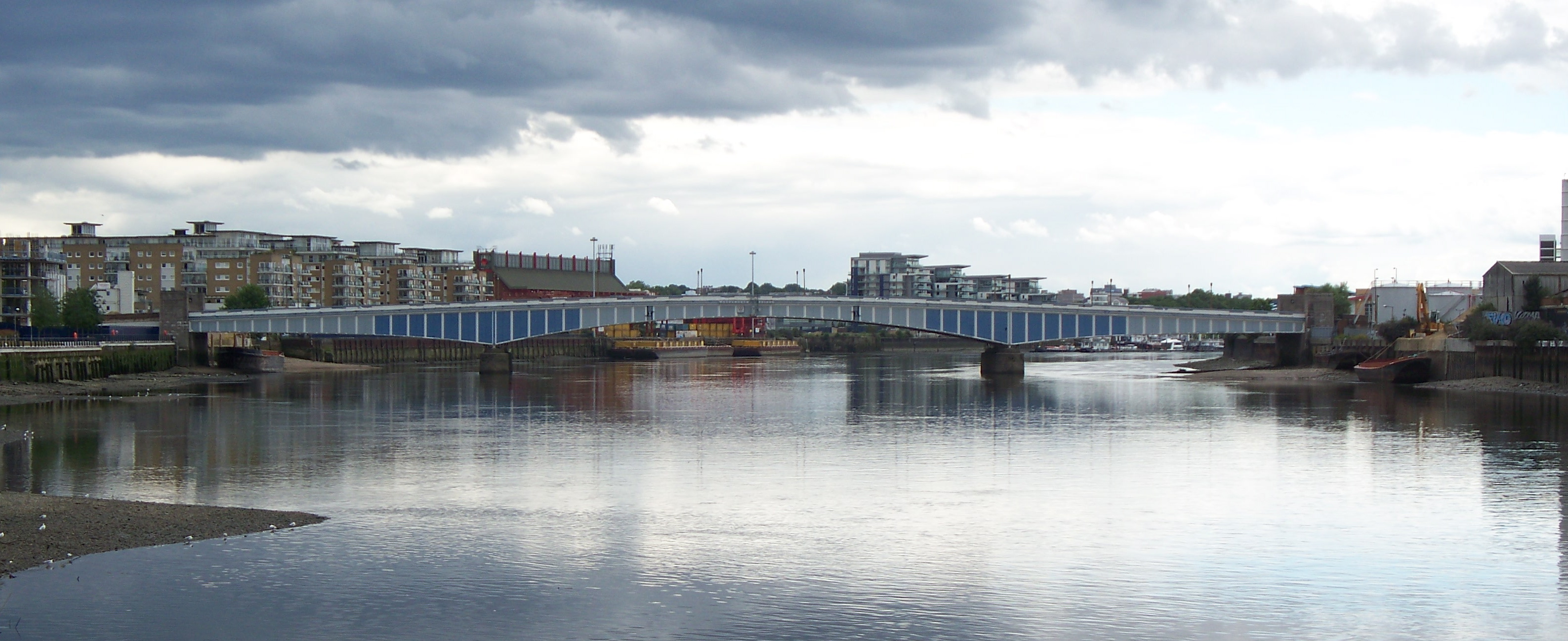
- Coordinates: 51.46500°N 0.18806°W
- Carries: A217 road
- Crosses: River Thames
- Locale: London, England
- Maintained by: Wandsworth London Borough Council
- Preceded by: Fulham Railway Bridge
- Followed by: Battersea Railway Bridge

Characteristics
- Design: Cantilever bridge
- Material: Steel
- Total length: 650 feet (200 m)
- Width: 60 feet (18 m)
- No. of spans: 3
- Clearance below: 39 feet (11.9 m) at lowest astronomical tide

History
- Designer: Thomas Peirson Frank
- Opened: 26 September 1873; 152 years ago (first bridge); 25 September 1940; 85 years ago (second bridge)

Statistics
- Daily traffic: 53,299 vehicles (2004)

Location
- Interactive map of Wandsworth Bridge

Wandsworth Bridge crosses the River Thames in west London. It carries the A217 road between the area of Battersea, near Wandsworth Town Station, in the London Borough of Wandsworth on the south of the river, and the areas of Sands End and Parsons Green, in the London Borough of Hammersmith and Fulham, on the north side.

The first bridge on the site was a toll bridge built by Julian Tolmé in 1873, in the expectation that the western terminus of the Hammersmith and City Railway would shortly be built on the north bank, leading to a sharp increase in the number of people wanting to cross the river at this point. The railway terminus was not built, and problems with drainage on the approach road made access to the bridge difficult for vehicles. Wandsworth Bridge was commercially unsuccessful, and in 1880 it was taken into public ownership and made toll-free. Tolmé's bridge was narrow and too weak to carry buses, and in 1926 a royal commission recommended its replacement.

In 1937 Tolmé's bridge was demolished. The present bridge, an unadorned steel cantilever bridge designed by Sir Thomas Peirson Frank, was opened in 1940. At the time of its opening it was painted in dull shades of blue as camouflage against air raids, a colour scheme it retains. Although Wandsworth Bridge is one of the busiest bridges in London, carrying over 50,000 vehicles daily, it has been described as "probably the least noteworthy bridge in London".

== Background ==
Although opposite each other across the River Thames, Fulham on the north bank and Wandsworth on the south bank were historically isolated from each other; the nearest crossing points were at Putney Bridge to the west and Battersea Bridge to the east, both over a mile from Wandsworth. The fast flowing but narrow River Wandle at Wandsworth was well-situated for driving watermills, leading to the rapid spread of industry in the area during the 19th century. Nearby Battersea Railway Bridge opened in 1863, but as the local population grew and London's built-up area began to encroach during the 19th century, pressure from local residents and businesses for a road bridge to be built increased.

Wandsworth Bridge Act 1864
- Act of Parliament
- Parliament of the United Kingdom
- Long title: An Act for incorporating the Wandsworth Bridge Company, and for authorizing them to make and maintain the Wandsworth Bridge, and to make Roads leading thereto; and for other Purposes.
- Citation: 27 & 28 Vict. c. ccxxxviii

Dates
- Royal assent: 25 July 1864

Text of statute as originally enacted

In 1864, it was expected that the newly formed Hammersmith and City Railway would build its western terminus on the north bank of the river between Chelsea and Fulham. In 1864, in anticipation of the new railway line generating high demand for a river crossing, an act of Parliament, the Wandsworth Bridge Act 1864 (27 & 28 Vict. c. ccxxxviii) was passed granting permission to the Wandsworth Bridge Company to build a bridge, to be financed by tolls, with the proviso that the bridge would be at least 40 feet (12 m) wide and cross the river with no more than three spans. Rowland Mason Ordish designed an Ordish–Lefeuvre Principle bridge to comply with the act's specifications, of a similar design to his nearby Albert Bridge. Wandsworth Bridge and Albert Bridge were authorised on the same day, the last private tollbridges authorised in London.

== 1873 bridge ==
Wandsworth Bridge Act 1870
- Act of Parliament
- Parliament of the United Kingdom
- Long title: An Act to extend the time for the completion of the Wandsworth Bridge and Approaches; and for other purposes.
- Citation: 33 & 34 Vict. c. cxxv

Dates
- Royal assent: 14 July 1870

Other legislation
- Repealed by: Local Law (Greater London Council and Inner London Boroughs) Order 1965

Status: Repealed

Text of statute as originally enacted

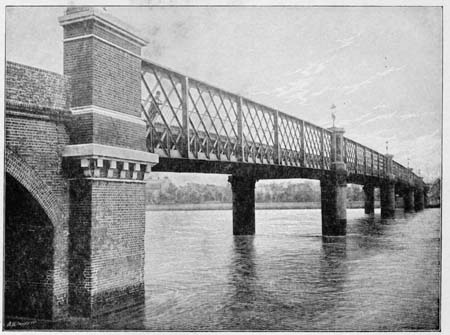
The first Wandsworth Bridge

The company was unable to finance the building of Ordish's design, and in 1870 a new act of Parliament, the Wandsworth Bridge Act 1870 (33 & 34 Vict. c. cxxv), was passed giving the company permission to build a bridge 30 feet (9.1 m) wide, crossing the river with five spans. Ordish was asked to design a cheaper bridge to the new specifications but refused to change the design, so Julian Tolmé was appointed designer in his place. Tolmé designed a starkly functional lattice truss bridge of wrought iron. It cost £40,000 (about £4.5 million in 2023) to build, and consisted of five identical spans, supported by four pairs of concrete-filled iron piers; each of the cylindrical piers was sunk 14 feet (4.3 m) into the riverbed. The bridge was due to open in early 1873, but the workmen building it went on strike, and a third act of Parliament was necessary to give the company time to resolve the dispute and complete the project.

Wandsworth Bridge was formally opened in a small ceremony on 26 September 1873, and a celebratory buffet was provided at the nearby Spread Eagle pub. A utilitarian structure made of mismatched materials purchased for cheapness, the new bridge elicited unenthusiastic responses; the Illustrated London News remarked at the time of its opening that "No attempt has been made to produce architectural effect, the structure being substantial rather than ornamental". A 1/2d toll was charged on pedestrians, and carts were charged 6d.

In 1867 the formerly independent Hammersmith and City Railway was absorbed by the Metropolitan Railway and the Great Western Railway, and was operated from then on by Metropolitan Railway trains. The plan for a terminus in Fulham was abandoned, and the line instead turned west at Hammersmith to run over London and South Western Railway tracks to Richmond. Although Wandsworth Town railway station, near the southern end of the bridge, had provided direct connections to central London since 1846, the lack of rail connections opening on the north bank meant the area on the Fulham side remained undeveloped, and bridge usage was low. Tolmé's design was not sturdy enough to carry heavy vehicles, and drainage problems on the approach road to the north discouraged vehicles from using Wandsworth Bridge.

=== Public ownership ===
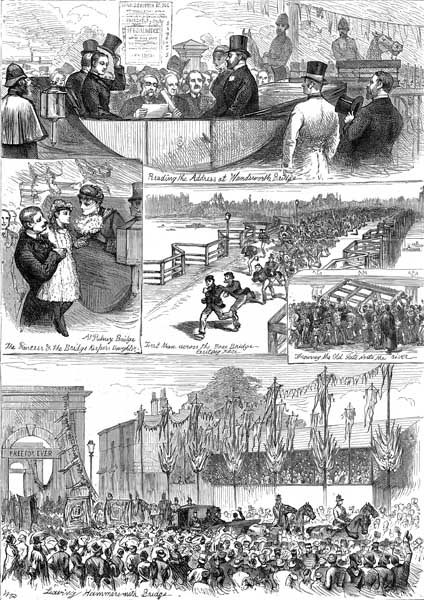
The abolition of bridge tolls, 1880. Clockwise from top, the images show: the address being read at the opening of Wandsworth Bridge; a race to be the first across Putney Bridge; the toll gates from Putney Bridge being thrown into the river; the Prince and Princess of Wales leaving Hammersmith Bridge; the bridge-keeper's daughter with the Princess of Wales at Putney Bridge.

Wandsworth Bridge never raised enough toll revenue to cover the costs of repairs and maintenance. The Metropolis Toll Bridges Act 1877 (40 & 41 Vict. c. xcix) was passed, and in 1880 Wandsworth Bridge, along with other London bridges, was taken into the public ownership of the Metropolitan Board of Works. Despite having run at a loss throughout its lifetime, the Board of Works paid £53,313 (about £6.3 million in 2023) for the bridge, a substantial premium on its £40,000 construction cost. On 26 June 1880 Edward, Prince of Wales, and Alexandra, Princess of Wales, presided over a ceremony abolishing tolls over the three bridges.

By the time it was taken into public ownership, the bridge was in very poor condition. In 1891 a weight limit of 5 tons was introduced, and in 1897 a 10 mph (16 km/h) speed limit was imposed. With its narrowness and weight restrictions, by this point it was effectively a footbridge. As narrowness and weight restrictions meant that it was unable to carry buses, in 1926 a royal commission recommended its replacement and the London County Council agreed to finance a new bridge on the site. In 1928 it was decided instead to give priority to widening the much busier Putney Bridge, and the replacement of Wandsworth Bridge was delayed.

== 1940 bridge ==
In 1935, the Ministry of Transport agreed to finance 60 per cent of the projected £503,000 (about £44.1 million in 2023) cost of a replacement bridge, and the London County Council approved a new design, by Sir Thomas Peirson Frank, for a three-span steel cantilever bridge 60 feet (18 m) in width, allowing two lanes of traffic in each direction, and designed to allow widening to 80 feet (24 m) if necessary. The design featured distinctive low curves, intended to reflect the low riverbanks in the area. The design was presented to the Royal Fine Art Commission for approval, with a covering note stating that "in the design of the bridge a severe simplicity of treatment has been carried out, expressed in a technique essentially related to the material proposed for its construction". Although the Commission expressed concern that the bridge might be too narrow, the design was approved. The work was put out for tender, with a stipulation that all materials used in the construction of the new bridge should be of British origin or manufacture.

The contract for the new bridge was awarded to Messrs Holloway Brothers (London), and work began in 1937. A temporary footbridge that had been used during the redevelopment of Chelsea Bridge between 1935 and 1937 was re-erected alongside Wandsworth Bridge, and the existing bridge demolished. The new bridge was expected to be complete in 1939; however, a shortage of steel in the buildup to the Second World War delayed its opening until 25 September 1940. The steel panels cladding the bridge were painted in varying shades of blue to camouflage it from German and Italian air raids, a colour scheme it retains today. Although it is one of London's busiest bridges, carrying over 50,000 vehicles per day, its drab colour scheme and minimalist design have led to it being described as "probably the least noteworthy bridge in London".

=== Later developments ===
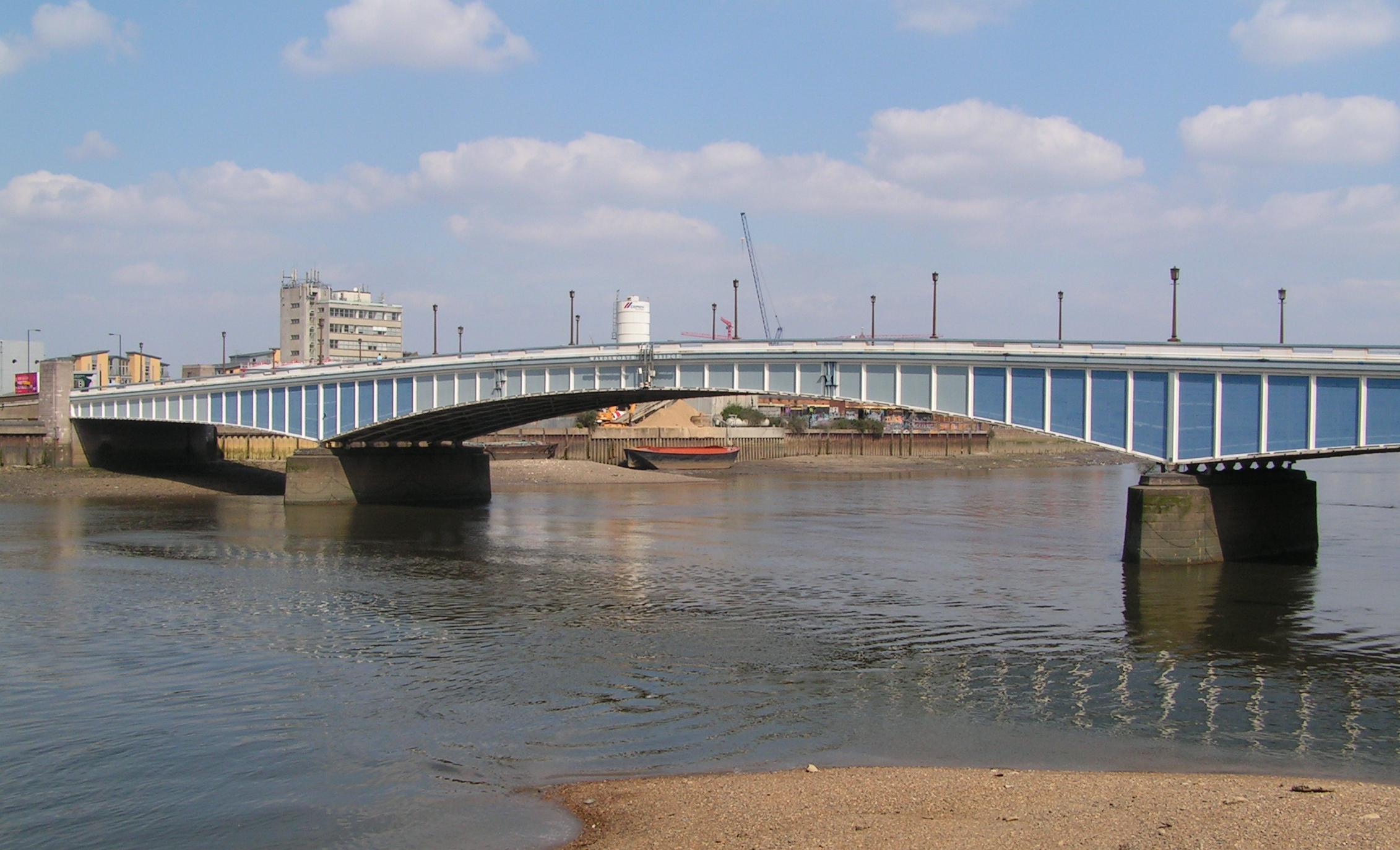
The current Wandsworth Bridge

Historically, the southern approach roads had been in poor condition and confusing to use. In 1969 the Greater London Council built the A214 road, a three-lane dual carriageway linking the southern end of Wandsworth Bridge to Tooting. At the immediate southern end of the bridge is a large roundabout adjacent to Wandsworth Town railway station, where Bridgend Road (A217), York Road (A3205), Swandon Way (A217) and Trinity Road (A214) meet. The roundabout is a noted example of 1960s modernist design, and served as the setting for parts of A Clockwork Orange in 1971.

Wandsworth Bridge now marks the boundary above which a lower speed limit on the Thames is enforced. A 12 knots (22 km/h) speed limit is now in force downstream from Wandsworth to Margaretness but because of the number of rowers using the upper reaches of the river, all of the tidal Thames upstream of Wandsworth Bridge is subject to a strictly enforced speed limit of 8 knots (15 km/h).

== See also ==
- List of lattice girder bridges in the United Kingdom
- List of crossings of the River Thames
- List of bridges in London
