= Halcrow Group =

British engineering consultancy company

Halcrow Group Limited
- Company type: Subsidiary
- Industry: Design; Construction; Engineering and business services
- Founded: 1868; 158 years ago
- Founder: Thomas Meik
- Headquarters: London, United Kingdom
- Number of locations: 90 offices worldwide, of which 28 are in the UK
- Key people: Tony Pryor (chairman); Peter Gammie (Group Chief Executive)
- Revenue: £238 million (2011)
- Number of employees: 3377 (2011)
- Parent: CH2M Hill (acquired by Jacobs in 2017)
- Website: www.halcrow.com

Halcrow Group Limited was a British engineering consultancy company. It was one of the UK's largest consultancies, specialised in the provision of planning, design and management services for infrastructure development worldwide. With interests in transportation, water, maritime and property, the company undertook commissions in over 70 countries from a network of more than 90 offices.

Established by Thomas Meik in 1868, the company quickly became involved in the maritime and railway industries across the British Isles. During the first half of the 20th century, William Halcrow led the business into new avenues of civil engineering, including deep tunnelling and hydroelectric dams. Its expertise was harnessed in many capacities throughout the Second World War, highlights include the construction of the Mulberry Harbours and consulting on the bouncing bomb. In the peacetime, Halcrow worked with the North of Scotland Hydro-Electric Board on a new generation of hydroelectric schemes to generate power for public consumption, such as the Glen Affric scheme, as well as numerous dams in Wales to regulate water levels and supply drinking water. It was also involved in the design studies for the Channel Tunnel as well as various other railway projects, such as the Woodhead Tunnel and the Victoria line.

By 2000, Halcrow Group's British-based projects accounted for roughly 60 percent of the company's turnover while the rest came from its overseas activities. During 2011, the company was acquired by US firm CH2M Hill, and in 2013 it was announced that the Halcrow brand would eventually be discontinued. The parent rebranded the whole group to CH2M in 2015. Two years later, CH2M was subsequently acquired by Jacobs Engineering Group.

== History ==
=== Origins ===
The company was founded in 1868 by civil engineer Thomas Meik, and originally bore his name, and later those of his sons, Patrick and Charles. It worked extensively on port, maritime and railway projects across the North of England, in Wales and in Scotland. During the 1890s, the business undertook the first of many international commissions.

=== 20th century ===
During the first half of the 20th century, William Halcrow (later Sir William) directed the company to diversify into other areas of civil engineering, including tunnelling and hydroelectric schemes. The company was called on for various projects during the Second World War, this included the design and supervision of the construction of deep tunnel shelters, military ports, and the Mulberry Harbours (used in the D-Day landings). The company also consulted on the bouncing bomb developed by Barnes Wallis and on damage control measures during The Blitz.

After the conflict ended, Halcrow's attention was soon focused upon various schemes in Scotland. For the North of Scotland Hydro-Electric Board, a new generation of hydroelectric schemes to generate power for public consumption was developed. The Glen Affric scheme, started in 1947, was the biggest of these; however, there were similar projects in neighbouring catchments, such as Glen Garry and Glen Moriston – the latter including one of the first underground power stations in the UK – and Strathfarrar and Kilmorack.

In Wales, Halcrow's largest works were typically related to water supply schemes, such as the Claerwen dam (completed in 1952) and the Clywedog dam (completed in 1967), which created reservoirs that controlled the water levels of various rivers as well as reliably supplying various towns and cities across the West Midlands. Halcrow also designed several railway tunnels, such as the Woodhead Tunnel (completed in 1954) and at Potters Bar (completed in 1955), as well as starting work on the new Victoria line underground line beneath central London. Halcrow was also involved in the design studies produced for the Channel Tunnel. In the aftermath of the Aberfan disaster, Halcrow was engaged by the National Coal Board to monitor the condition of various colliery spoil tips across the country.

The company's overseas work at this time included a wide range of roads, bridges and harbours in countries such as Ghana, Libya and Mozambique. Halcrow also worked on multiple dams in Venezuela (Macagua Dam I - 1956), as well as a power station in Buenos Aires.

The firm had several names during the 20th century, including CS Meik and Buchanan (1920), CS Meik and Halcrow (1923), WT Halcrow and Partners (1941), Sir William Halcrow and Partners (1944), and, finally, Halcrow Group (1998).

=== 21st century ===
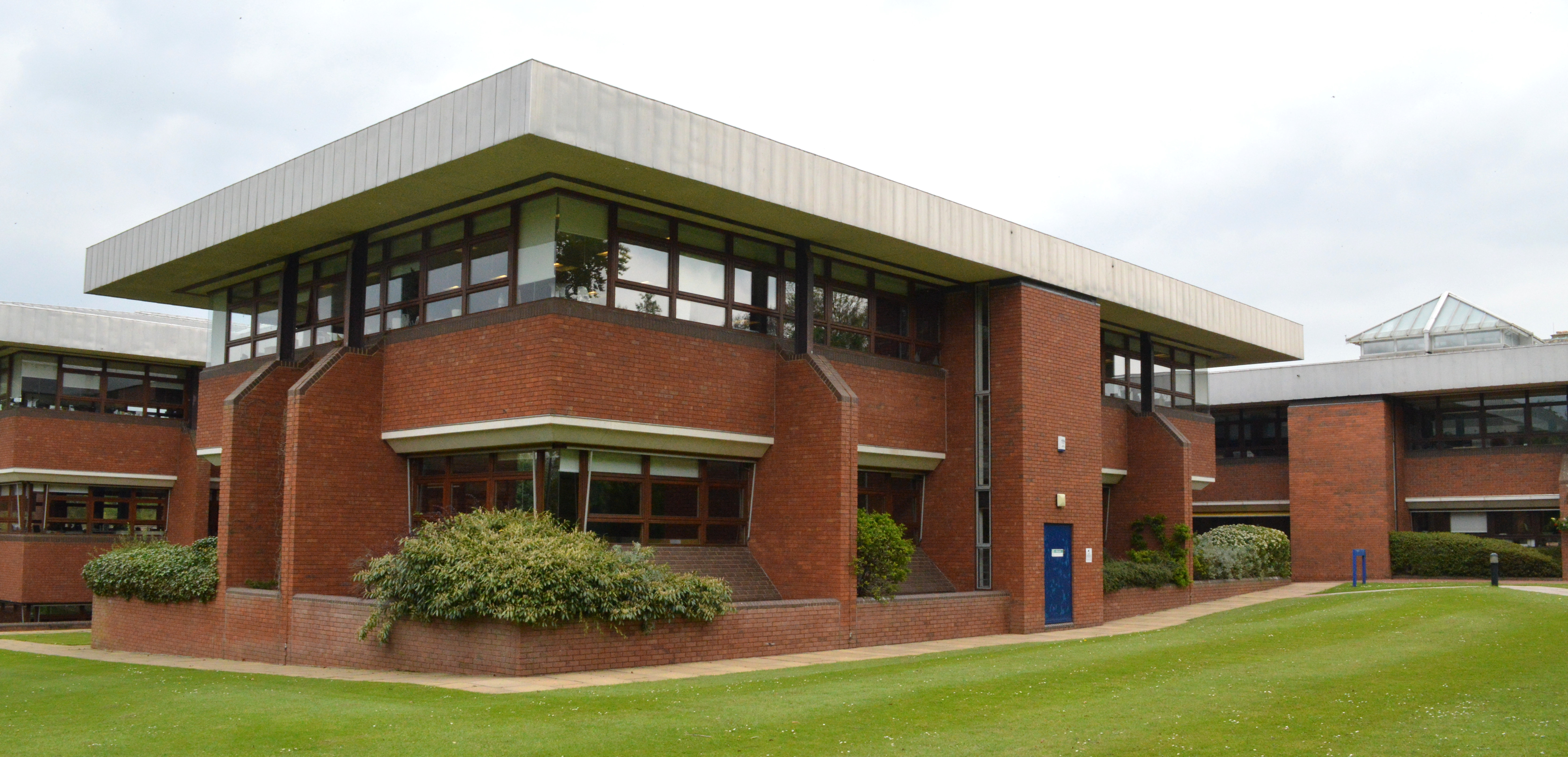
Halcrow offices at Burderop Park, near Swindon, in 2013

By 2000, Halcrow Group's British-based projects accounted for roughly 60 percent of the company's turnover, while the remainder was derived from its undertakings outside of the British Isles. By this point, the firm's consultancy work included a wide array of water, transportation, maritime, environment, power and property projects. Its customers included government departments, public sector authorities and utilities, industrial and commercial companies, international funding agencies and financial institutions.

During 2008, the company reported a turnover of £468 million; by this point, projects undertaken outside the UK accounted for 48% of total turnover. It was long owned and managed by its employees and staff shareholders, Halcrow was operated as an independent concern up until late 2011.

==== CH2M ====
During September 2011, CH2M Hill announced it was set to acquire the company, and on 10 November 2011 CH2M Hill announced that it had completed the acquisition of Halcrow in exchange for £124m.

It was subsequently reported that Halcrow was effectively rescued by CH2M Hill, having incurred a pre-tax loss of £71m in its last year of independent trading (to 31 December 2011), on a turnover of £238m, down from £331m in 2010. Accounts lodged with Companies House showed that CH2M Hill's financial backing was crucial to Halcrow's survival; the US firm agreed a secured loan to the company in December 2012 without which there would have been doubt regarding the firm's ability to continue as a going concern.

==== Jacobs Engineering Group ====
On 2 August 2017, CH2M agreed to be purchased by Jacobs Engineering Group in a US$2.85 billion cash and stock deal. Shareholders approved the deal in December 2017, and the completion of the acquisition was announced on 18 December.

== Notable modern projects ==
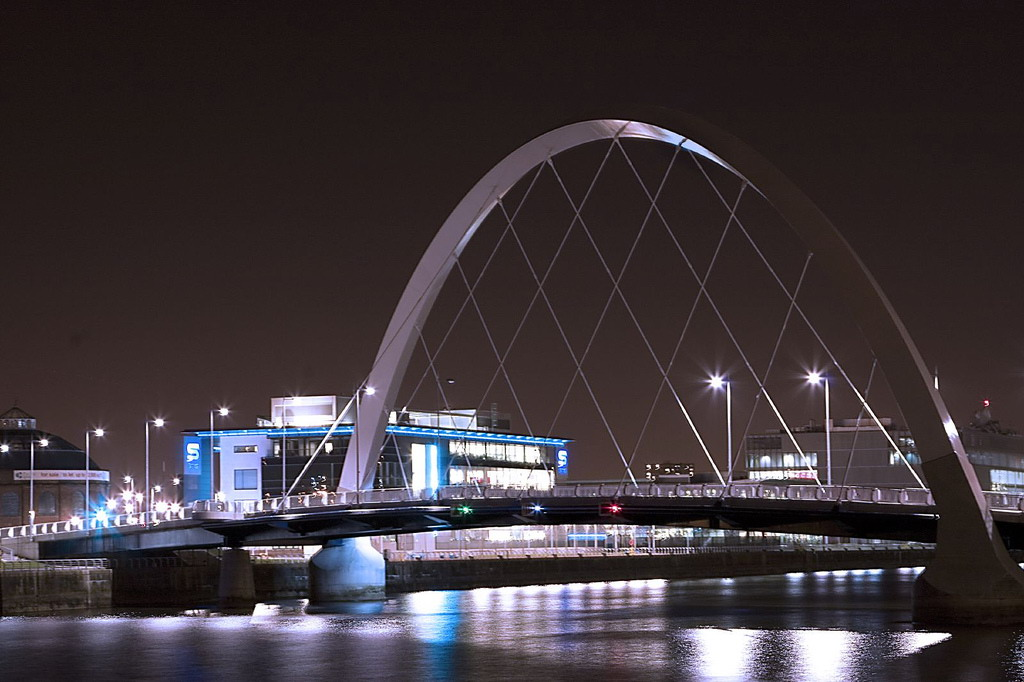
As designer, Halcrow Group delivered the ‘Clyde Arc’ across the River Clyde in Glasgow.

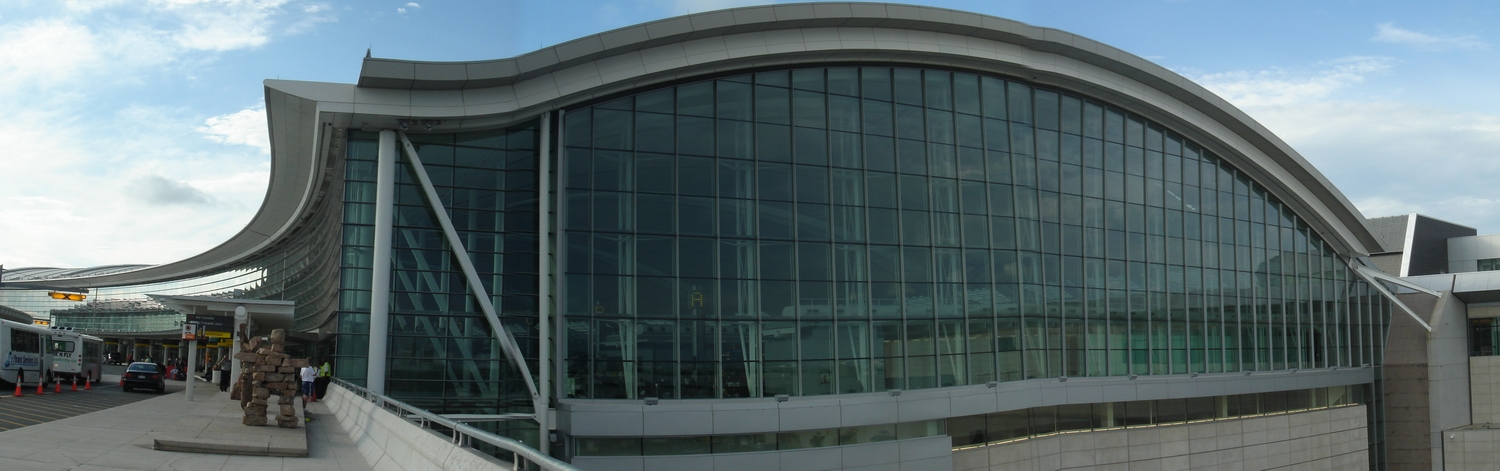
Toronto Pearson International Airport: Halcrow Yolles was the structural engineer of record for the passenger terminal facility.

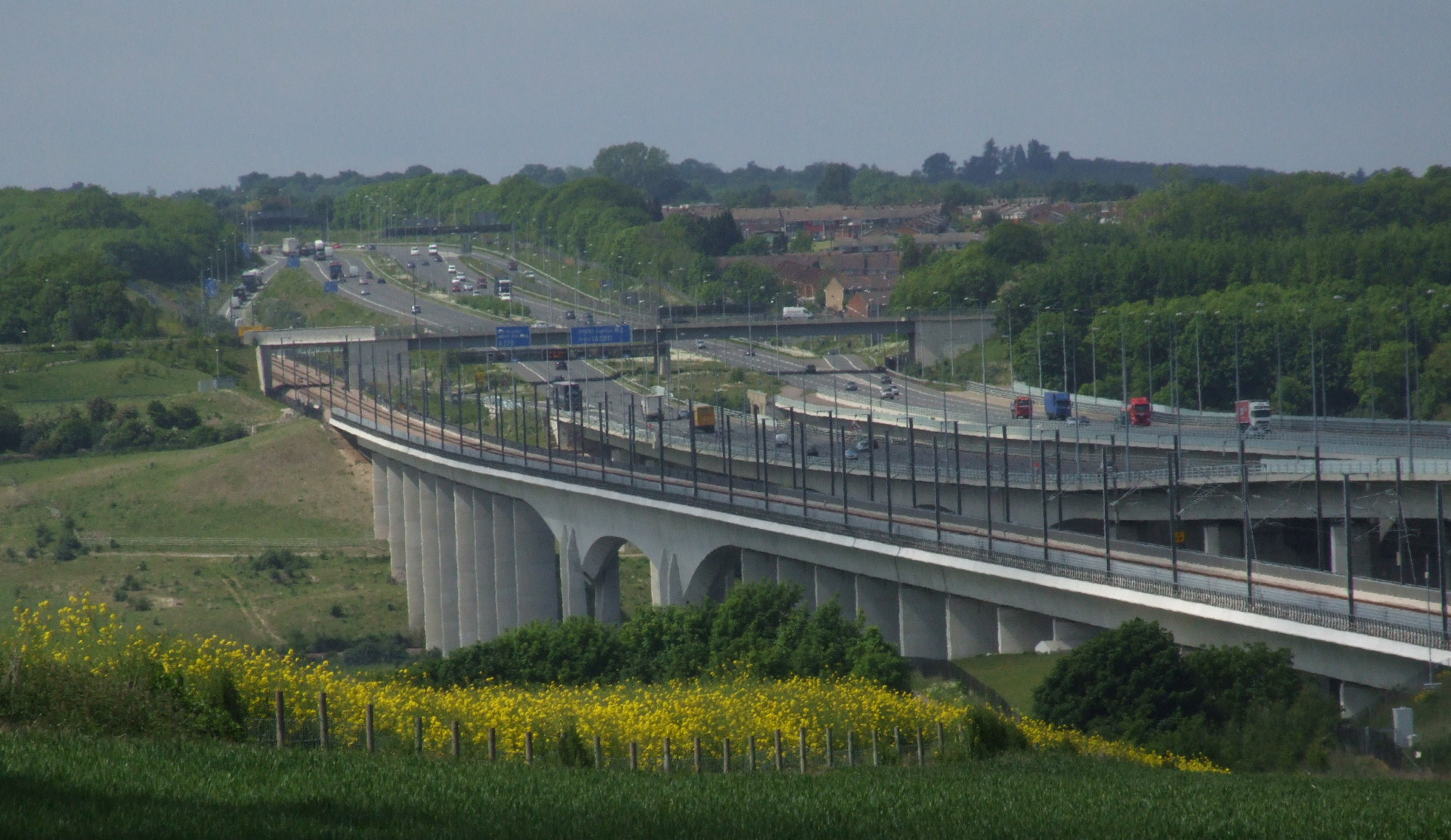
The 1260m long Medway Viaduct carries the high-speed Channel Tunnel Rail Link across the estuary of the River Medway. The viaduct is the largest bridge on the CTRL route and it has become a symbol for the new high speed railway.

- Second Severn Crossing (UK; completed 1996) - Halcrow, in partnership with French consultant SEEE, designed the crossing on behalf of the Laing-GTM joint venture that won a £330 million contract to design and build the bridge.
- Toronto Pearson International Airport (Toronto, Ontario, Canada; completion c. 2006) - Halcrow Yolles was the structural engineer of record for the passenger terminal facility. It was involved in the early concept design of the Central Processor roof structure in collaboration with Ove Arup and Partners; all remaining concept design, and all final administration services were provided by Halcrow Yolles.
- Clyde Arc Bridge (Glasgow, UK; completed 2006) - Halcrow designed this landmark bridge structure across the River Clyde in central Glasgow. The bridge provides access to the Pacific Quay development.
- One King Street West (Toronto, Ontario, Canada; completed 2007) - Halcrow provided full structural engineering services to this slender 51-storey condominium-hotel linked to the existing 14-storey Toronto Dominion Bank building (c. 1915).
- Sheikh Zayed Grand Mosque (completed 2007) - Halcrow were commissioned in 2001 to fulfil the role of construction supervisor working closely with the contractor, Impregilo of Italy, for the first phase of the project: the structural shell of the building. Following completion of the concrete structure Halcrow acted as the project consultant for the second phase up to completion of the project late in 2007 when the mosque was first opened to worshippers.
- Channel Tunnel Rail Link (High Speed 1) (UK; completed 2007) - Halcrow, as part of the Rail Link Engineering consortium, was responsible for all design and project management services on this project, delivering the £5.8 billion system on time and within budget.
- Abu Dhabi International Airport (Abu Dhabi; completed 2008) - Halcrow was commissioned to carry out planning, design and site supervision for a second runway at Abu Dhabi International Airport.
- Al Garhoud Bridge (Dubai; completed 2008)
- Yas Island Development (Abu Dhabi; completed 2009) - Halcrow acted as the client's appointed lead consultant responsible for the design and construction supervision of the primary infrastructure for this mixed-use 2500ha island development.
- Busan-Geoje Fixed Link (South Korea; completed 2010) - Halcrow TEC JV was appointed Technical Advisers to Daewoo Engineering & Construction Co., Ltd, who were leading the consortium which had been awarded the concession to design, construct and operate this US$1100m transport link.
- Bond Street Station Upgrade (UK; detailed design 2010-12) - Halcrow was part of the design team, along with consultants Atkins appointed by Costain Laing O'Rourke Joint Venture for the upgrading of the existing Bond Street Station in Central London
- Thames Hub (UK; concept 2011) - Halcrow provided technical advice to architects Foster + Partners for its Thames Hub proposal for integrated infrastructure development in the Thames Estuary in the UK.
- Tottenham Court Road tube station Upgrade (UK; completed 2017) - multi-disciplinary lead designer for London Underground with architects Acanthus and Hawkins Brown.

== See also ==
- Hafren Power
