= Julian Tolmé =

British civil engineer (1836–1878)

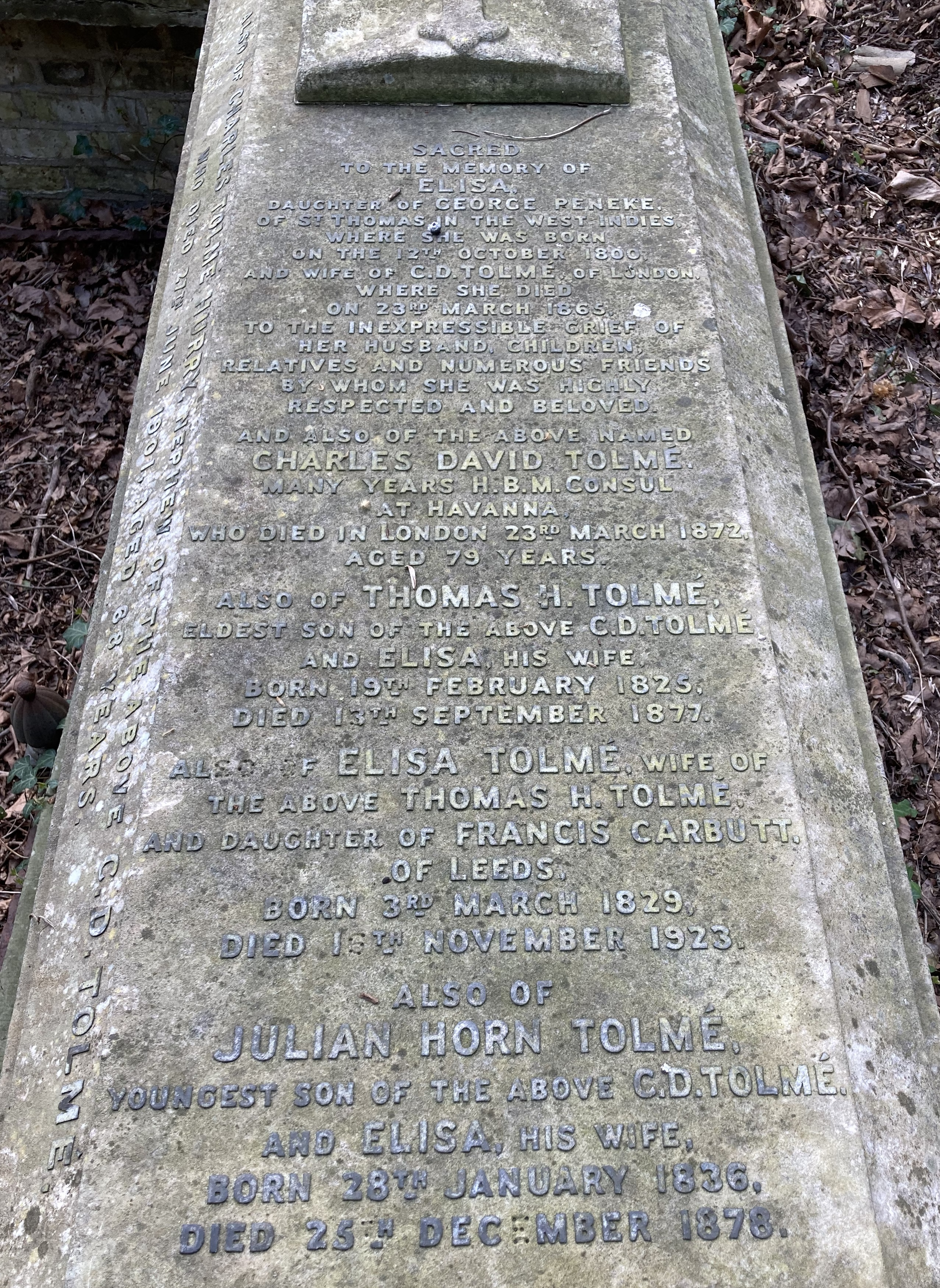
Family grave of Julian Horn Tolme in Highgate Cemetery

Julian Horn Tolmé (28 January 1836 – 25 June 1878) was a British civil engineer, and the builder of the first Wandsworth Bridge in 1873, which was a toll bridge.

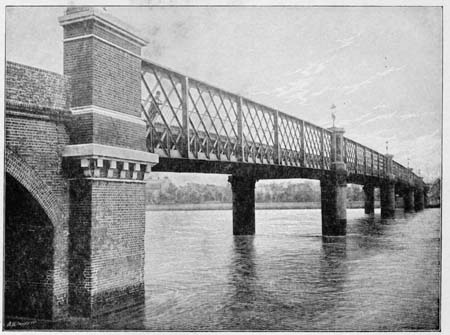
The first Wandsworth Bridge

== Life ==
Julian Horn Tolmé was born in Havana, Cuba, on 28 January 1836, the son of Charles David Tolmé, who was a merchant and the British Consul there. He was educated at King's College London.

He suffered from rheumatism, and died on 25 June 1878, at Lindfield, West Sussex and is buried in a family vault on the west side of Highgate Cemetery.
