= Kinlochleven hydroelectric scheme =

Hydroelectric scheme for aluminium smelter in Scottish Highlands

Kinlochleven Hydroelectric Scheme
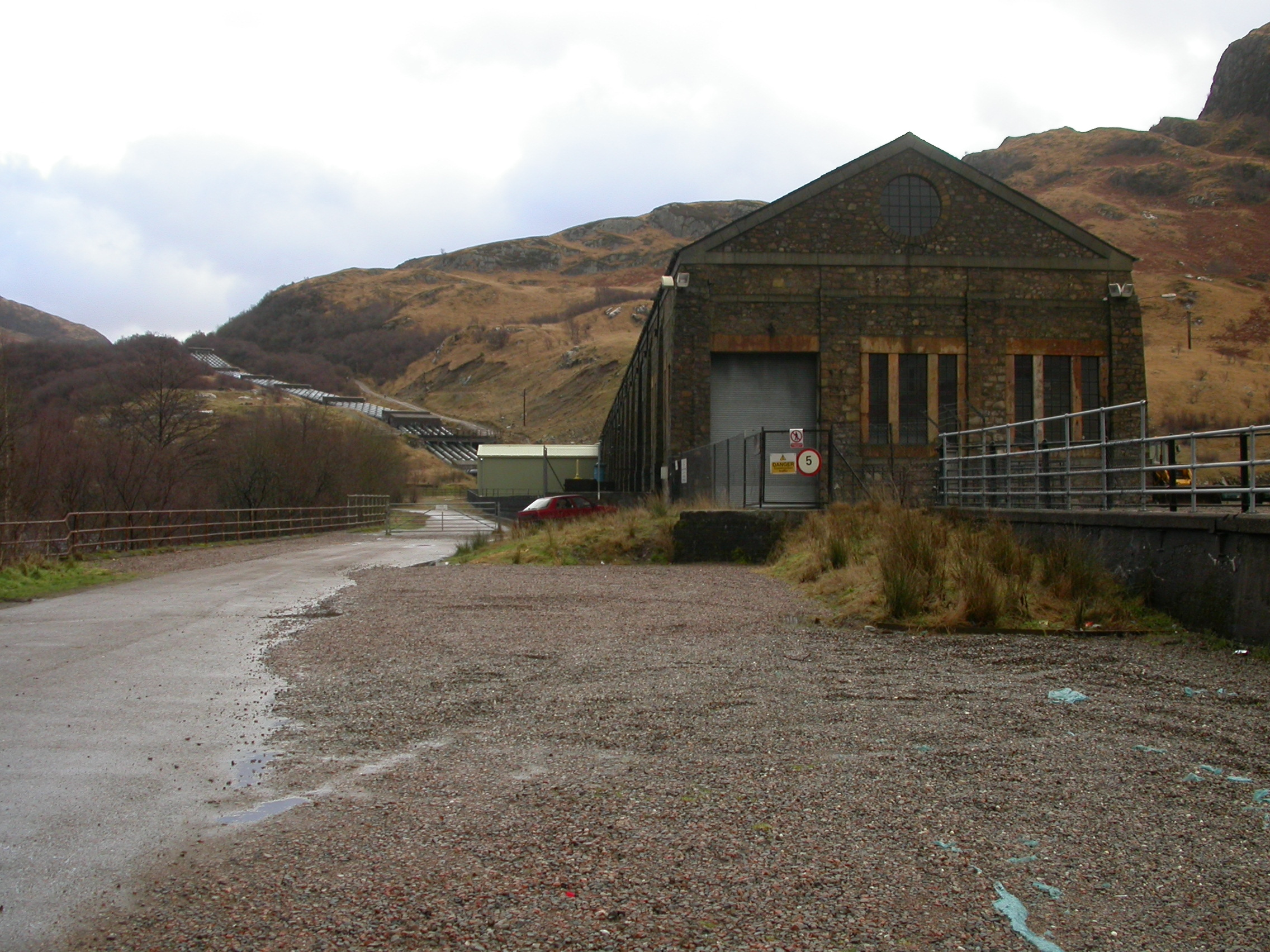
- Power house with penstocks behind
- Country: Scotland, UK
- Location: Kinlochleven, Highland
- Coordinates: 56°42′46″N 4°57′29″W
- Status: Operational
- Construction began: 1904
- Commission date: 1907–1909 (refurbished 1996-2000)

Power generation
- Units operational: 3 × 10 MW
- Make and model: Gilkes Francis turbines
- Units decommissioned: 11 × 2 MW (DC) Escher Wyss (Zürich) Pelton

The Kinlochleven hydroelectric scheme was built between 1905 and 1909 to supply power for an aluminium smelter owned by British Aluminium. It was the second in Scotland after the 1896 Falls of Foyers scheme. The smelter and power house were constructed on the south bank of the River Leven in the village of Kinlochleven, in the south-west of the Scottish Highlands.

The Blackwater Reservoir was formed by constructing a mass concrete gravity dam over ½ mile (800 m) wide across the Blackwater, the main tributary of the River Leven. This has a catchment area of 60 square miles (160 km^{2}). Water is conveyed along a covered concrete conduit 3.5 miles (5.6 km) long, which also collects water from three side stream intakes. The water descends 935 feet (285 m) from the valve house to the power house via six steel pipes.

Power was originally generated by 11 Pelton wheel turbines and three auxiliary sets, with a total capacity of 25,725 kW. These were replaced between 1996 and 2001 by Gilkes, who installed three 10 MW Francis turbines.

The aluminium smelter closed in 2000, but the power station continues to export power via the National Grid to the Lochaber smelter in Fort William, via an upgraded 132 kV overhead line.

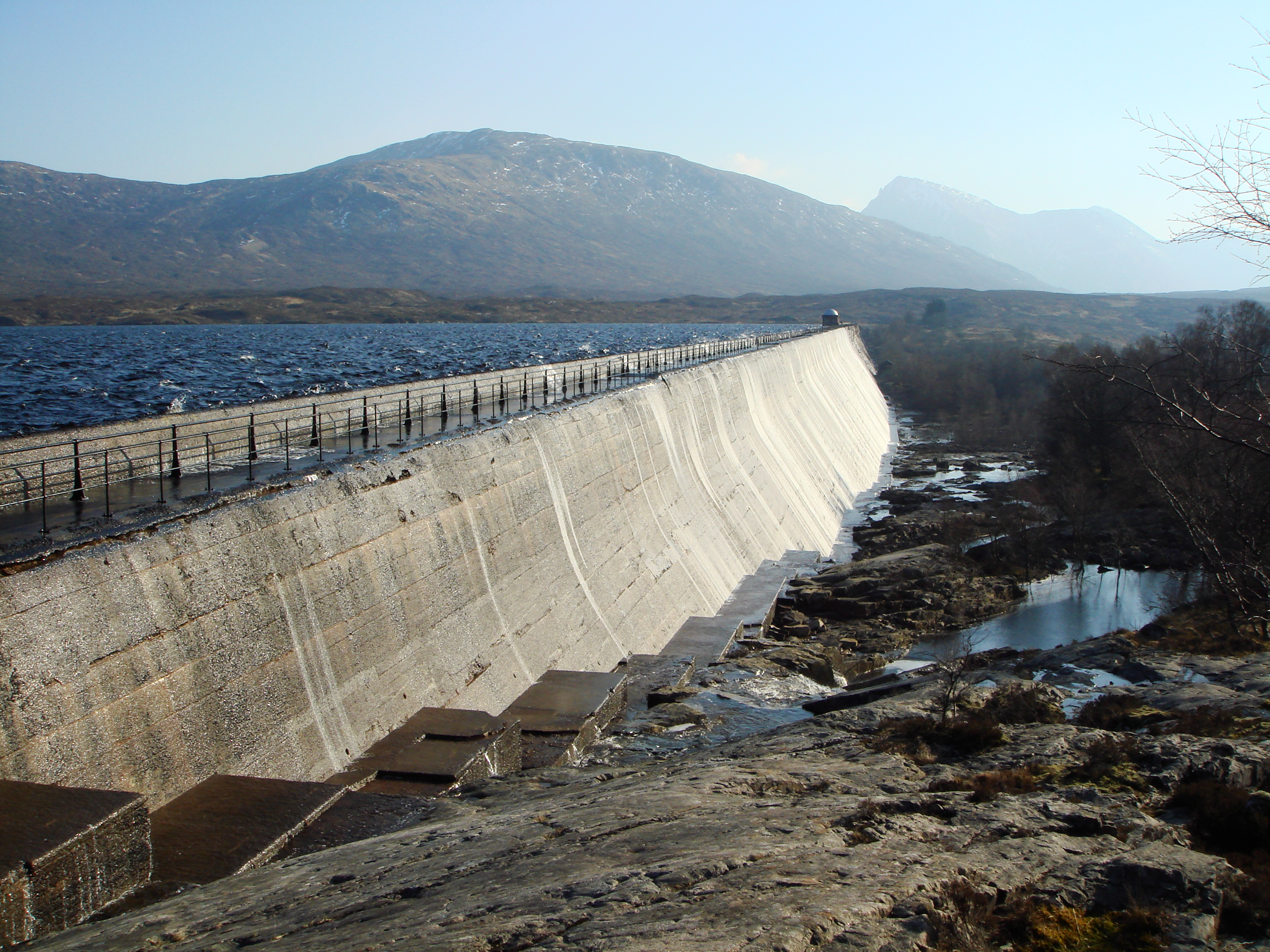
The Blackwater Dam overflowing with excess water.

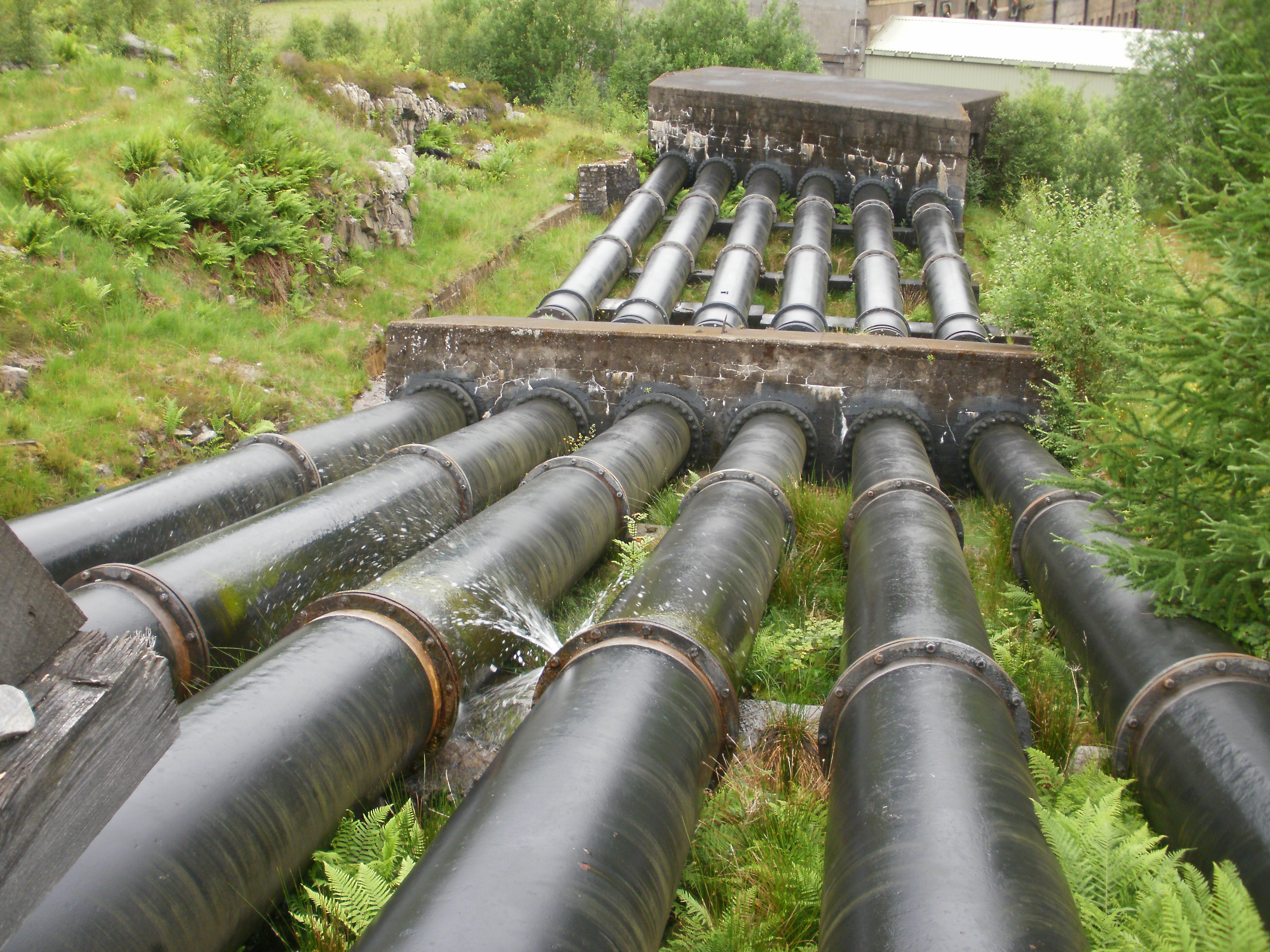
The six steel penstocks and associated thrust blocks just upstream of the power house

== History ==
The scheme was consented by the Loch Leven Water Power Acts of 1901 and 1904, the latter of which extended the time available for completion and had some variations in the scheme. The scheme was designed by Thomas Meik and Sons, with consulting input from Sir A R Binnie.

=== Construction ===
Construction of the hydroelectric scheme started in 1905, and took approximately four years. The main contractor was Sir John Jackson Ltd, with A H Roberts as the resident engineer. Construction cost about £600,000, or around £60m adjusted for inflation to 2024.

The workforce was largely Irish Navvies, with around 3,000 men working in squalid conditions. Many died in construction accidents, and were buried in a graveyard beside the dam, with concrete headstones. Patrick MacGill's semi-autobiographical novel Children of the Dead End (1914) gives an account of the conditions experienced by the navvies working on the scheme.

Materials were transferred to the Blackwater Dam construction site by means of an aerial cableway from a wharf on Loch Leven. This was supported on trestles 10–130 ft (3–40 m) high with spans of 100–1,000 ft (30–305 m), and powered by a temporary hydroelectric plant with a 250 horsepower (190 kW) Pelton wheel. A railway was also constructed between the wharf and the dam. This had two rope inclines of 200 and 600 feet (61 and 183 m), but otherwise generally followed the contours of the valley.

The Blackwater Dam was 3,112 feet (949 m) long and 86 feet (26 m) high. It was constructed just upstream of Dubh Lochan, and inundated Lochan Inbhir, Lochan na Sàlach Uidre and Loch a'Bhàillidh. During construction, it was found the unit weight of concrete made with local aggregate was lower than used in design calculations, so the profile of the dam was amended to give it a wider base, with an overturning factor of safety of 2.28.

From the dam, water is conveyed along a reinforced concrete conduit, 8 feet (2.4 m) square and 3.5 miles (5.6 km) long, with a fall of 1 in 1000. After passing through the valve house, the water descends 935 feet (285 m) through six parallel high-pressure penstocks made of steel, each 39 inches (0.99 m) in diameter and 5,750 feet (1,750 m) long.

==== Loch Eilde Mòr expansion ====
During World War I, due to increasing demands for aluminium, Balfour Beatty was commissioned to construct a dam and aqueduct to bring additional water for the scheme from Loch Eilde Mòr, increasing the catchment to around 66 square miles (170 km^{2}). This was constructed by 1,200 German prisoners of war and 500 British troops "of low medical category".

=== Operation ===
A temporary smelter was constructed and commenced production in 1907, although this closed after the main works opened in 1909.

The power house originally had 11 Pelton turbines made by Escher Wyss (Zürich). Each turbine was coupled to two 1,000 kW DC generators made by Dick, Kerr & Co., which powered the smelting process. There were also two AC generators for auxiliary power. The total capacity of the scheme was 25 725kW, with the annual output of the hydroelectric scheme reaching 160 GWh, a load factor of around 80%.

=== Plans for further expansion ===
To meet the expected increase in demand for Aluminium, the British Aluminium Company drew up plans to further expansion of the scheme to capture water from the catchments of Loch Treig and Loch Laggan which would be transferred to a second powerhouse at Kinlochleven. In 1918, a Provisional Order for this was promoted in Parliament for this, however this was abandoned due to opposition on two main topics. Firstly the transfer of water from the catchment of the Lochy to that of the Leven. Secondly, Inverness County Council wanted to use this water for industrial development in Fort William in Inverness-shire, while Kinlochleven was in neighbouring Argyllshire. A new act was then drawn up for the Lochaber hydroelectric scheme, which instead had the power station in Fort William.

=== Smelter closure and power station upgrade ===
In 1994, closure of the smelter was by around the end of the century was announced by the owners at that time Alcan Smelting and Power UK Ltd. It eventually closed in June 2000. The power house building was Grade A listed on 3 August 2004.

Gilkes installed three 10 MW horizontal-axis Francis turbines between 1996 and 2001, in stages while the facility was operating. The first turbine (K1) was installed in 1996, and was controlled by a simple PLC to maintain grid frequency. The other turbines (K2 & K3) were installed in 1999 and 2000. The full system was controlled by a Gilkes digital speed governor, which allows the scheme to operate in an 'island' mode if the grid fails. Flow to each of the three turbines comes from two of the six penstocks, with a new Y-piece and downstream lateral compensator. Each turbine has a peak flow of 4.15 m³/s.

=== Downrating for Renewables Obligation ===
In April 2002, Kinlochleven the "Declared Net Capacity" (DNC) was downrated to 19.5 MW from the previous 30 MW, permitting accreditation under the Renewables Obligation (RO) support mechanism which only applied to hydropower schemes with a DNC under 20 MW. The DNC is the maximum continuous power output of the plant, excluding that used by the facility.

The rules of the RO (Scotland) were changed in 2018, allowing the capacity of the hydropower station to be upgraded back to 27.5 MW, although it only gets RO support for 19.5 MW, the 8 MW increase receives no subsidy. The upgrade was completed by April 2020, and in the week before 21 April the scheme generated an average of 23.27 MW (approximately 3.9 GWh total).

== Related hydro schemes ==
=== Loch Eilde Mor Hydro (Kinlochleven extension) ===
With the Kinlochleven scheme downrated, plans were drawn up to directly harness the water from Loch Eilde Mòr. A 5 MW scheme was approved by the Scottish Government in July 2011.

In 2017, a smaller 2 MW scheme was commissioned. This involved modifications to the original dam and intake, approximately 3 km of new pipework, and a powerhouse on the north bank of the River Leven, with a three-jet horizontal Pelton wheel turbine. The scheme cost around £13.6 million to construct, and will contribute an annual community benefit of £5000/MW.

=== River Leven Hydro Scheme ===
Planning permission was granted to Green Highland Renewables in March 2019, amended a year later, to construct an 800 kW scheme at the base of the Blackwater Dam. This uses the hydraulic head of the dam to generate additional power. Construction of the scheme was between January and November 2021.

Water is diverted from one of the three cast-iron pipes 42 inches (1.1 m) in diameter which pass through the base of the dam, through a new turbine and returned to the original stilling pond. The water then flows through the concrete conduit to Kinlochleven.

== Aluminium smelter ==
In 1909 when the smelter was completed, the total annual output of all other smelters in Britain was about 2,500 tons, which was less than one third the designed output of the Kinlochleven smelter. The smelter produced about 8,000 tonnes per year, significantly less than modern plants which produce around 250,000, which meant it was less economical to run.

Peak employment in the smelter was over 700 people, although by January 1999 there were just 96 employees.

== Railway ==
A narrow-gauge railway approximately a mile long linked the pier on the southern shore of Loch Leven and the smelter, which operated between 1906 and 1960. It was double track throughout with a gauge of 3 feet (0.91 m) and overhead electric power at 500–550 V DC, making it the first electric railway in Scotland. Four-wheeled electric locomotives were built in Preston, Lancashire by Dick, Kerr & Co. (who also made the generators for the hydroelectric scheme) to haul freight only.

== Bibliography ==
- Payne, Peter Lester (1988). The hydro: a study of the development of the major hydro-electric schemes undertaken by the North of Scotland Hydro-Electric Board. Aberdeen, Scotland: Aberdeen University Press. pp. 5–9. ISBN 978-0-08-036584-8.
- Paxton, Roland; Shipway, J. (2007). Scotland - Highlands and islands. Civil engineering heritage. Royal Commission on the Ancient and Historical Monuments and Constructions of Scotland. London: Thomas Telford. pp. 172–174. ISBN 978-0-7277-3488-4. OCLC 155675101.
- Witherall, Raoul (January–February 2000). "Alcan winds down oldest operational smelter". Aluminium Today, 12. 12 (1). ProQuest 1372745991.
