= Thomas Meik =

Scottish engineer

Thomas Meik (20 January 1812 – 22 April 1896) was a 19th-century Scottish engineer.

He is particularly associated with ports and railways in Scotland and northern England, Meik fathered two prominent engineering sons: Patrick Meik and Charles Meik. The firm they founded remains active, today part of the Jacobs Engineering Group.

== Early career ==
He was born at Easter Duddingston on 20 January 1812, the son of Patrick Meik and his wife, Barbara Scott.

Educated at the High School and University of Edinburgh, Thomas Meik worked for two years with a firm of millwrights named Moodie and was then apprenticed to John Steedman, an engineer and contractor who was working in Glasgow on the Hutcheson Bridge (designed by Robert Stevenson, grandfather of author Robert Louis Stevenson).

His first long-term post was as assistant engineer to William Chadwell Mylne of the New River Company, London.

== River Wear Commission ==
In 1845, at the age of 33, Meik was appointed engineer to the River Wear Commission (responsible for maritime works around Sunderland). In 1859, the commission took over the construction of the Hendon Dock on the south side of the Wear, and Meik was responsible for the entire works (the task included a grain warehouse and a lighthouse – which, although relocated when the South Pier was shortened in 1983, still stands today). Just a few miles further north, he was also consulting engineer to Blyth Harbour from 1862.

== Partnerships ==
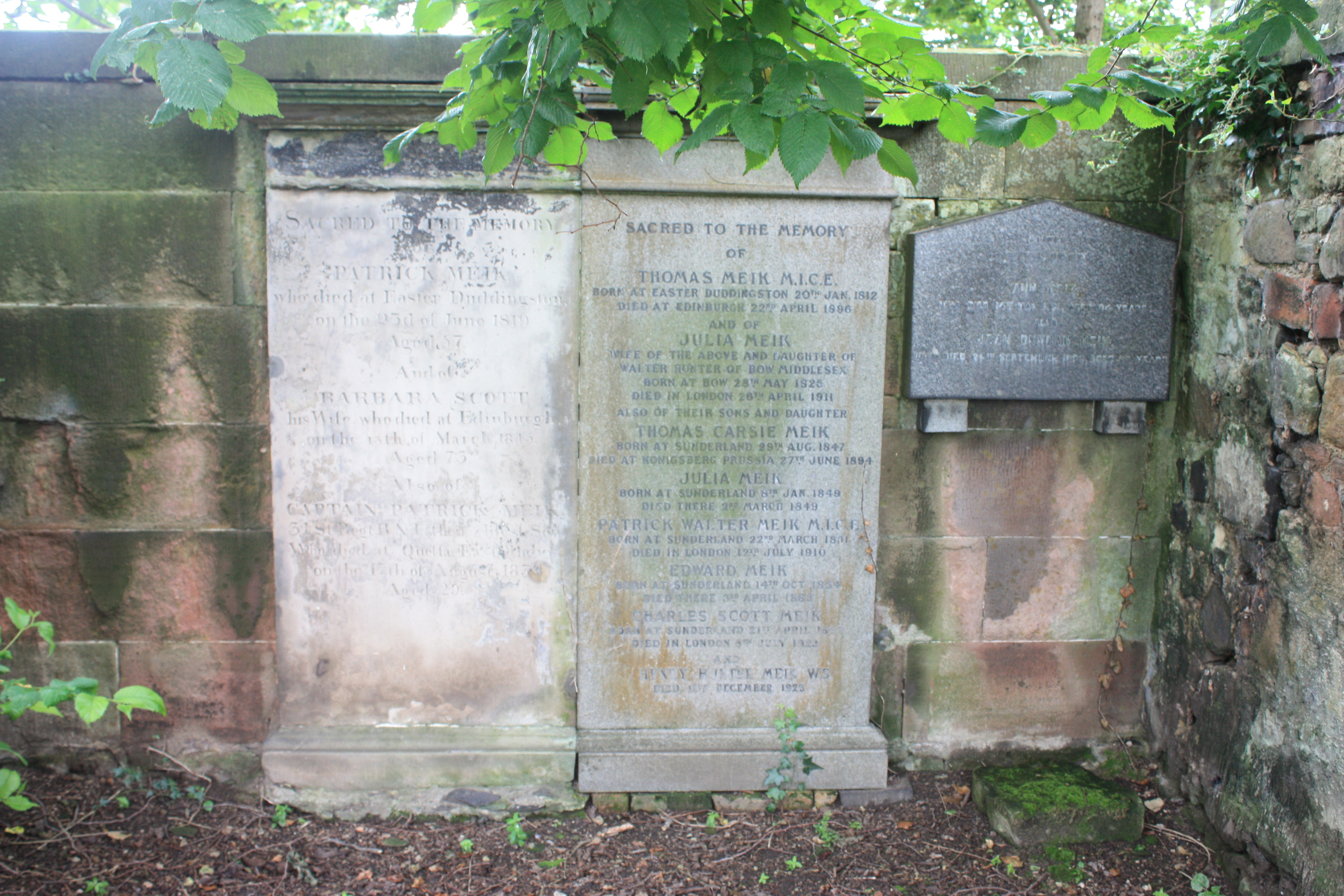
The grave of Thomas Meik, Duddingston Kirkyard

In 1868, he entered into partnership with William David Nisbet (1837–1897) in Sunderland and Edinburgh. Commissions included a rail freight link, the Hylton, Southwick and Monkwearmouth Railway, transporting coal from collieries sited along the line to the nearby port at Sunderland. The railway was subsequently acquired by the North Eastern Railway. However, later railway designs were to prove more successful for Meik. In Scotland he designed a rail link to Eyemouth, an extension to the Forfar to Brechin line, the Newburgh and North Fife Railway and the East Fife Central Railway.

The partnership with Nisbet was dissolved in 1875 and Meik formed a new partnership with his sons. Work included the Scottish ports of Ayr, Burntisland and Bo'ness, and the firm acted as consulting engineers to the new dock at Silloth for the North British Railway.

In 1880 he had offices at 6 York Place, Edinburgh.

He retired in 1888 and died at his home in Newbattle Terrace in Edinburgh in 1896 aged 84, leaving his business in the hands of his sons, Patrick and Charles. He was buried in Duddingston Kirkyard. The grave lies in the south-west corner.

The firm they founded remains active. It was later known as Halcrow Group Limited, taking its name from Sir William Halcrow, who joined the company in the early years of the 20th century; Halcrow was acquired by US firm CH2M Hill in 2011, and in 2017 CH2M was acquired by Jacobs Engineering Group.

== Family ==
He was married to Julia Hunter (1825–1911), daughter of Walter Hunter of Bow in Middlesex.

Their children included Thomas Carsie Meik (1847–1894), Julia (died in infancy), Patrick Walter Meik MICE (1851–1910), Edward (died in childhood), Charles Scott Meik (1853–1923) and Henry Hunter Meik WS (d.1923).
