= Toll bridge =

Bridge for which road usage tolls are charged

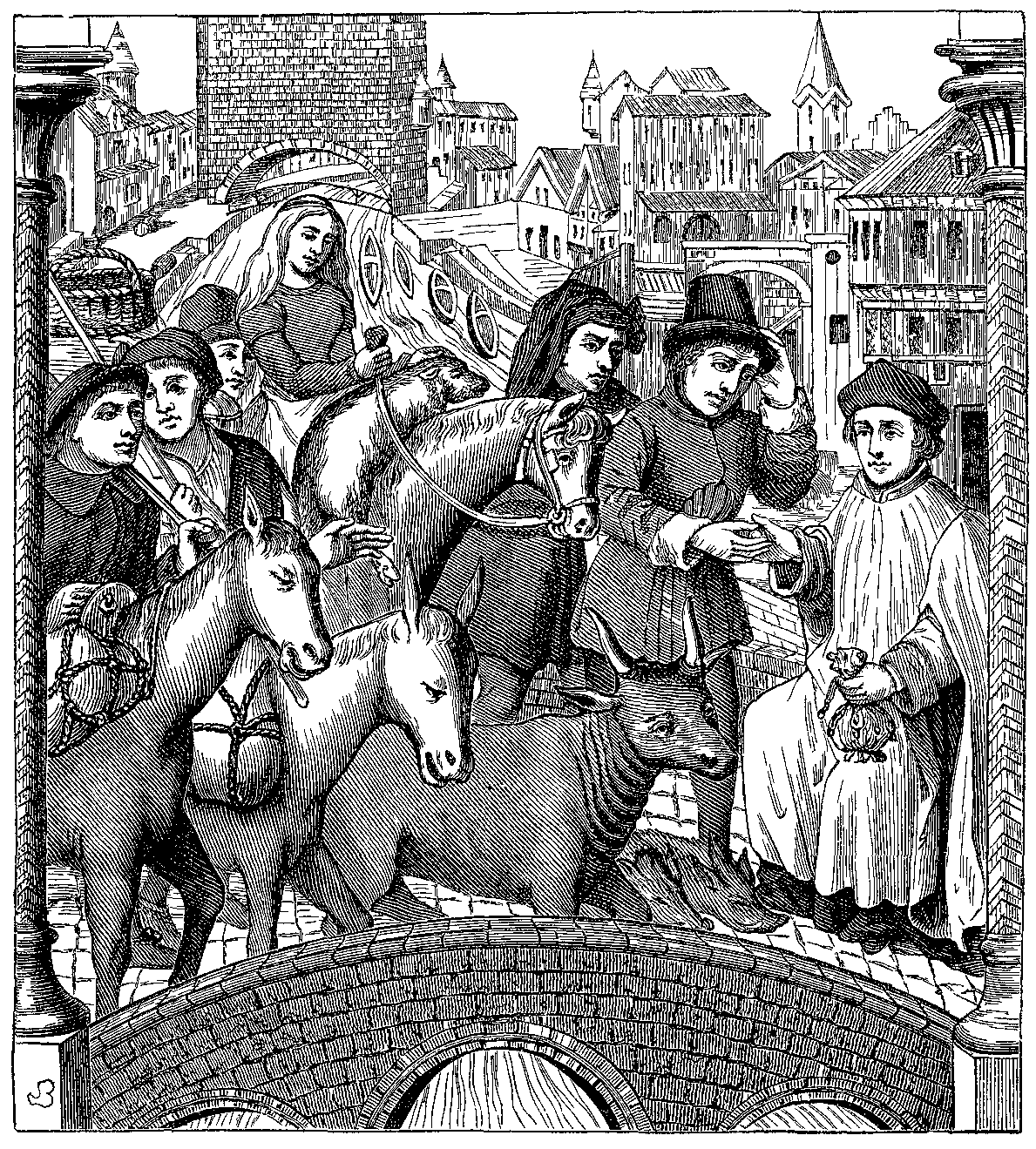
Paying toll on passing a bridge. From a painted window in the Tournai Cathedral (15th century).

A toll bridge is a bridge where a monetary charge (or toll) is required to pass over. Generally the private or public owner, builder and maintainer of the bridge uses the toll to recoup their investment, in much the same way as a toll road.

== History ==
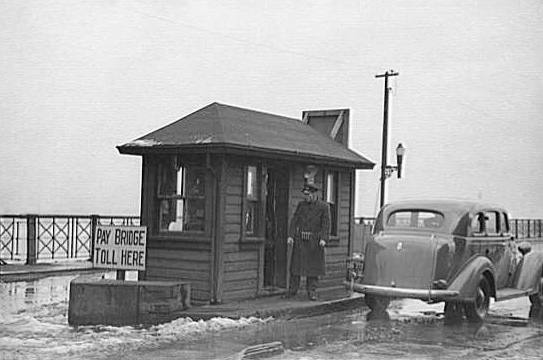
Toll booth at Mississippi River Bridge at St. Louis, Missouri U.S. Library of Congress

The practice of collecting tolls on bridges harks back to the days of ferry crossings where people paid a fee to be ferried across stretches of water. As boats became impractical to carry large loads, ferry operators looked for new sources of revenue. Having built a bridge, they hoped to recoup their investment by charging tolls for people, animals, vehicles, and goods to cross it.

The original London Bridge across the river Thames opened as a toll bridge, but an accumulation of funds by the charitable trust that operated the bridge (Bridge House Estates) saw that the charges were dropped. Using interest on its capital assets, the trust now owns and runs all seven central London bridges at no cost to taxpayers or users.

In the United States, private ownership of toll bridges peaked in the mid-19th century, and by the turn of the 20th century most toll bridges were taken over by state highway departments. In some instances, a quasi-governmental authority was formed, and toll revenue bonds were issued to raise funds for construction or operation (or both) of the facility.

Peters and Kramer observed that "little research has been done to quantify the impact of toll collection on society as a whole" and therefore they published a comprehensive analysis of the Total Societal Cost (TSC) associated with toll collection as a means of taxation. TSC is the sum of administrative, compliance, fuel and pollution costs. In 2000 they estimated it to be $56,914,732, or 37.3% of revenue collected. They also found that a user of a toll road is subject to a form of triple taxation, and that toll collection is a very inefficient means of funding the development of highway infrastructure. Nakamura and Kockelman (2002) show that tolls are by nature regressive, shifting the burden of taxation disproportionately to the poor and middle classes.

Electronic toll collection, branded under names such as EZ-Pass, SunPass, IPass, FasTrak, Treo, GoodToGo, and 407ETR, became increasingly prevalent in metropolitan areas in the 21st century. Amy Finkelstien, a public finance economist at MIT, reports that as the fraction of drivers using electronic toll collection increased, typically toll rates increased as well, because people were less aware of how much they were paying in tolls.

Electronic tolling proposals that represented the shadow price of electronic toll collection (instead of the TSC) may have misled decision-makers. The general public has additionally endured an increased administrative burden associated with paying toll bills and navigating toll collection company on-line billing systems. Additionally, visitors to a region may incur e-toll tag fees imposed by their rental car company. The Paperwork Reduction Act of 1980 identified and attempted to address a similar problem associated with the government collection of information. Approvals were to be secured by government agencies before promulgating a paper form, website, survey or electronic submission that will impose an information collection burden on the general public. However, the act did not anticipate and thus address the burden on the public associated with funding infrastructure via electronic toll collection instead of through more traditional forms of taxation.

== Removal and continuation of tolls ==
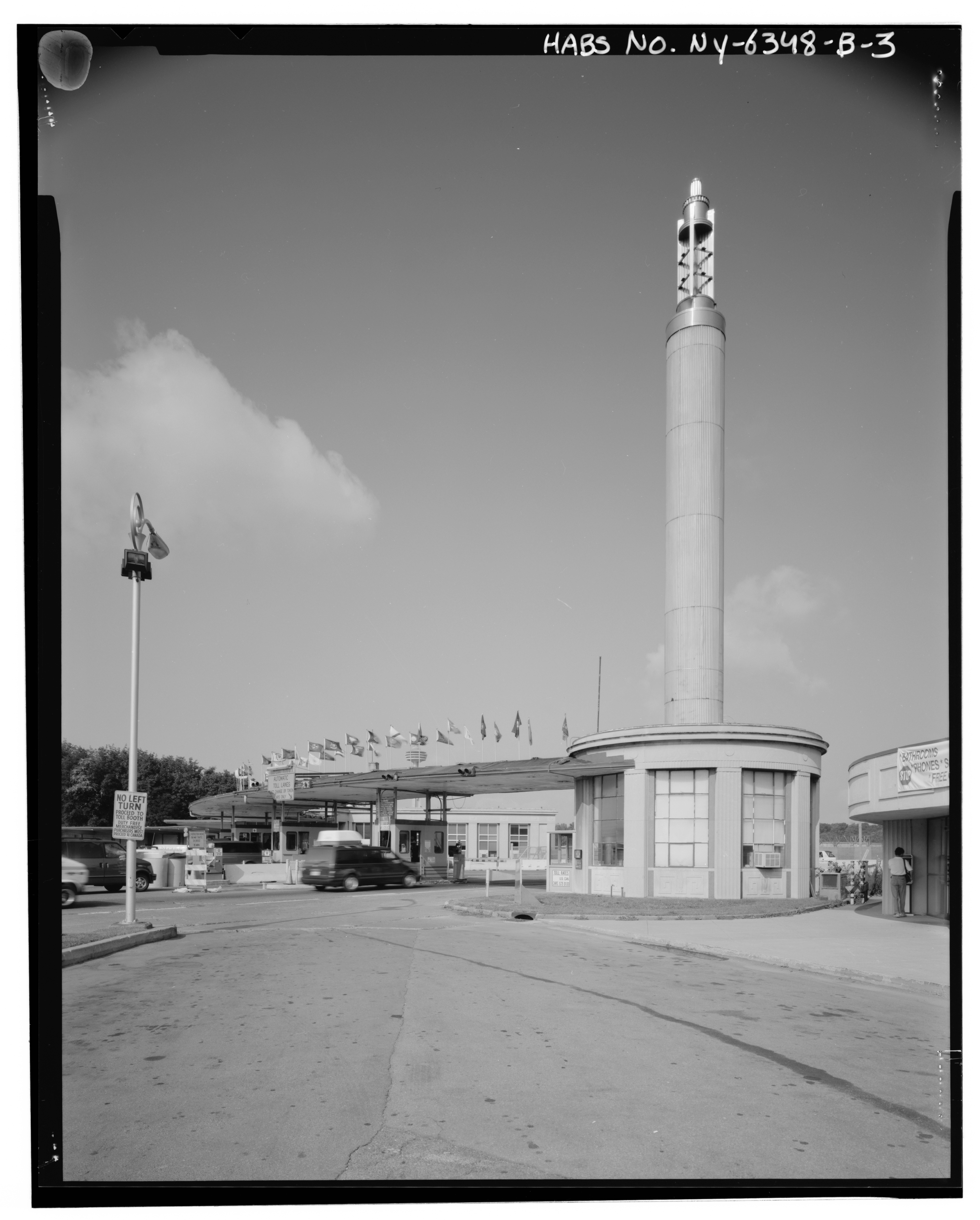
Toll plaza at the Rainbow Bridge, Niagara County, New York

In some instances, tolls have been removed after retirement of the toll revenue bonds issued to raise funds. Examples include the Robert E. Lee Memorial Bridge in Richmond, Virginia which carries U.S. Route 1 across the James River, and the 4.5-mile long James River Bridge 80 miles downstream which carries U.S. Highway 17 across the river of the same name near its mouth at Hampton Roads. In other cases, especially major facilities such as the Chesapeake Bay Bridge near Annapolis, Maryland, and the George Washington Bridge over Hudson River between New York City and New Jersey, the continued collection of tolls provides a dedicated source of funds for ongoing maintenance and improvements.

Sometimes citizens revolt against toll plazas, as was the case in Jacksonville, Florida. Tolls were in place on four bridges crossing the St. Johns River, including I-95. These tolls paid for the respective bridges as well as many other highway projects. As Jacksonville continued to grow, the tolls created bottlenecks on the roadway. In 1988, Jacksonville voters chose to eliminate all the toll booths and replace the revenue with a ½ cent sales tax increase. In 1989, the toll booths were removed, 36 years after the first toll booth went up.

In Scotland, the Scottish Parliament purchased the Skye Bridge from its owners in late 2004, ending the requirement to pay an unpopular expensive toll to cross to Skye from the mainland.

In 2004, the German government cancelled a contract with the "Toll Collect" syndicate after much negative publicity. The term "Toll Collect" became a popular byword among Germans used to describe everything wrong with their national economy.

== Toll collection ==
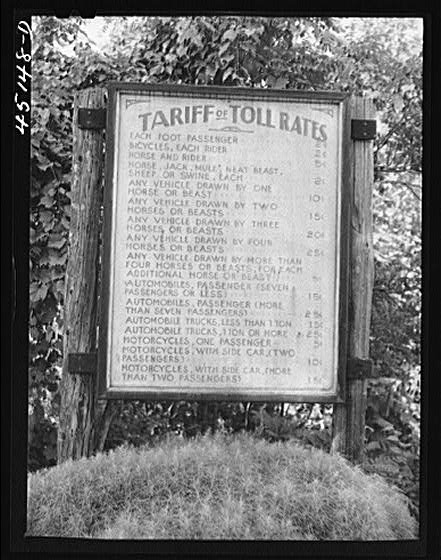
Toll rates at Connecticut River Bridge between New Hampshire and Vermont U.S. Library of Congress

It has become increasingly common for a toll bridge to only charge a fee in one direction. This helps reduce the traffic congestion in the other direction, and generally does not significantly reduce revenue, especially when those travelling the one direction are forced to come back over the same or a different toll bridge.

== Toll avoidance: shunpiking ==
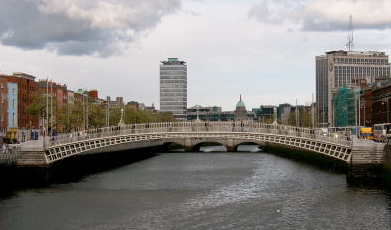
Dublin's famous Ha'penny Bridge

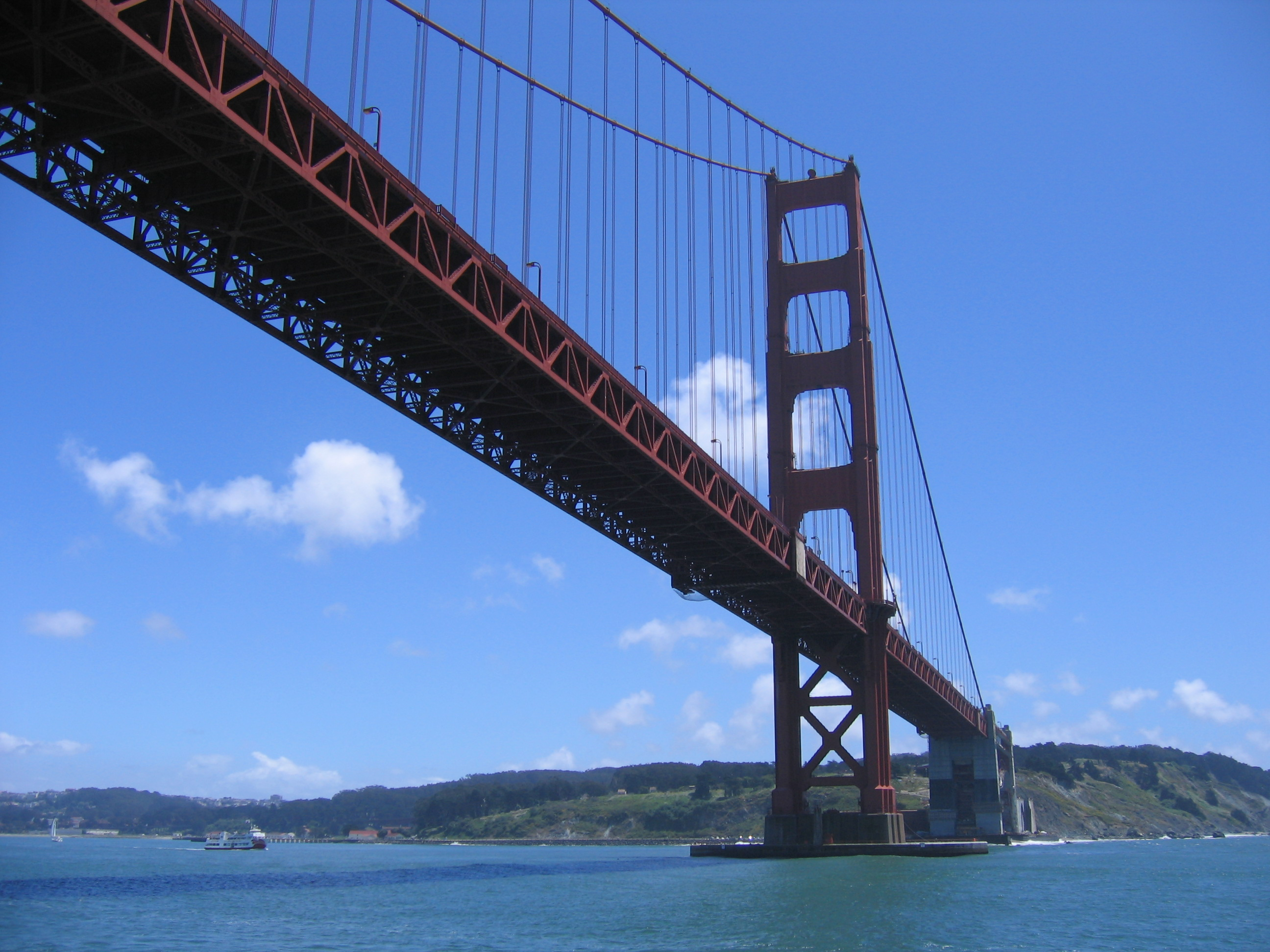
The Golden Gate Bridge

A practice known as shunpiking evolved which entails finding another route for the specific purpose of avoiding payment of tolls.

In some situations where the tolls were increased or felt to be unreasonably high, informal shunpiking by individuals escalated into a form of boycott by regular users, with the goal of applying the financial stress of lost toll revenue to the authority determining the levy.

One such example of shunpiking as a form of boycott occurred at the James River Bridge in eastern Virginia. After years of lower-than-anticipated revenues on the narrow privately funded structure built in 1928, the state of Virginia finally purchased the facility in 1949 and increased the tolls in 1955 without visibly improving the roadway, with the notable exception of a new toll plaza. The increased toll rates incensed the public and business users alike. Joseph W. Luter Jr., head of Smithfield Packing Company, the producer of Smithfield Hams, ordered his truck drivers to take a different route and cross a smaller and cheaper bridge. Tolls continued for 20 more years, and were finally removed from the old bridge in 1976.

== Historic examples of toll bridges ==
=== Austria ===
- Europa Bridge: Part of the Brenner Autobahn, leading to the Brenner Pass in the Alps.

=== England ===
- London Bridge
- The Humber Bridge: Previously the world's longest bridge, the Humber bridge links the counties of Yorkshire and Lincolnshire near the port city of Kingston upon Hull
- Bristol Clifton Suspension Bridge
- Wandsworth Bridge: Originally designed by Julian Tolmé in 1873, it was a toll bridge until it was taken into public ownership in 1880 and made toll-free.

=== Ireland ===
- Ha'penny Bridge: This cast iron pedestrian bridge was built in 1816 over the River Liffey in Dublin and takes its name from the historical toll amount (a half-penny).

=== North America ===
- Ambassador Bridge between Detroit, Michigan, and Windsor, Ontario, Canada; a bridge privately built in 1929.
- Collins Bridge, longest wooden bridge in the world when opened in 1913, across Biscayne Bay between Miami on the mainland and the barrier island which became Miami Beach, Florida.
- George Rogers Clark Memorial Bridge crossing the Ohio River between Louisville, Kentucky, and Clarksville, Indiana. Opened as a toll bridge in 1929; tolls removed in 1946.
- James River Bridge, longest bridge over water in the world when completed in 1928, across the James River between then-Warwick County and Isle of Wight County near Hampton Roads.
- Florida Overseas Highway between Florida and Key West, Florida. Built on the former alignment of the Key West Extensions of the Florida East Coast Railway, it included the Seven Mile Bridge.
- San Francisco–Oakland Bay Bridge between Oakland and San Francisco.
- Golden Gate Bridge between San Francisco and Marin County.
- Mackinac Bridge connecting the Upper Peninsula and Lower Peninsula of Michigan at the Strait of Mackinac connecting Lake Michigan and Lake Huron
- Sunshine Skyway Bridge between Tampa, Florida, and St. Petersburg, Florida

== See also ==
- List of toll bridges
