= Peirson Frank =

British engineer and surveyor (1881–1951)

Sir Peirson Frank
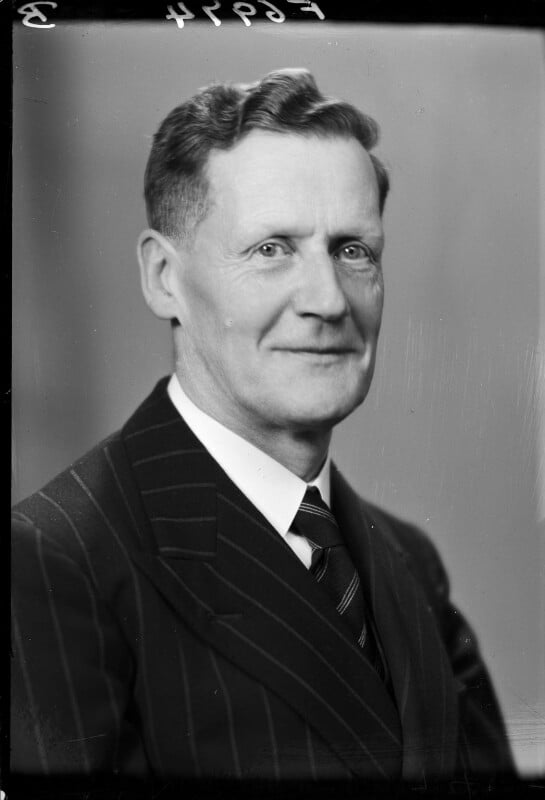
- Frank in 1944
- Born: Thomas Peirson Frank; 23 July 1881; Kirkbymoorside, Yorkshire
- Died: 12 November 1951 (aged 70); London, England
- Engineering career
- Discipline: Civil engineering
- Institutions: Institution of Civil Engineers (president)
- Projects: Waterloo Bridge; Wandsworth Bridge; Putney Bridge

Sir Thomas Peirson Frank (23 July 1881 – 12 November 1951) was a British civil engineer and surveyor. He is particularly remembered as "the man who saved London from drowning" in the Blitz.

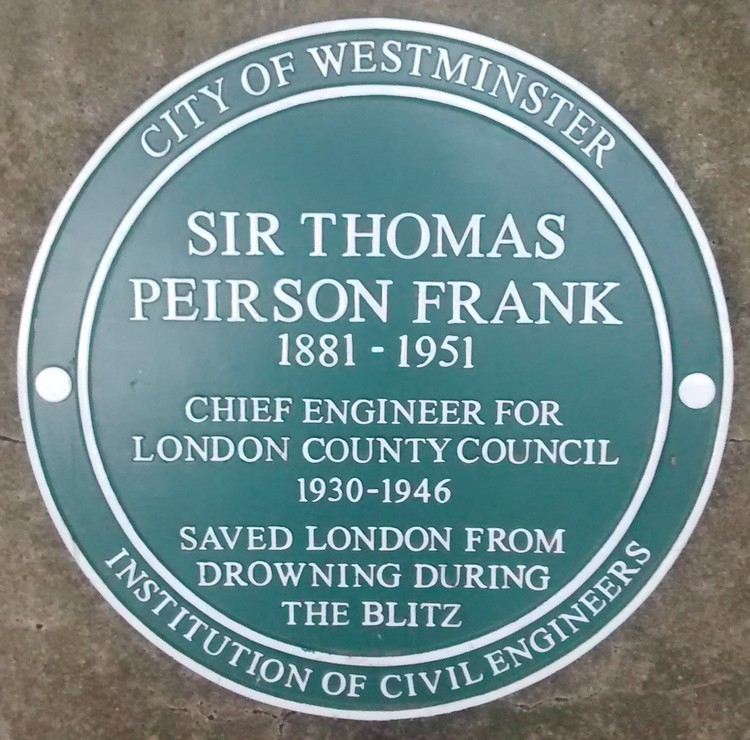
Sir Thomas Peirson Frank plaque on Embankment wall in Victoria Tower Gardens, Westminster, London SW1

Frank was born in 1881 at Kirkbymoorside, Yorkshire, the son of farmer Thomas Peirson Frank and Jane Shepherd. He was elected to the Smeatonian Society of Civil Engineers in 1937 and was president of the Royal Town Planning Institute in 1944. He was elected president of the Institution of Civil Engineers for the November 1945 to November 1946 session.

Before 1930 Frank was engineer for a number of local authorities, before serving as chief engineer of the London County Council from 1931 to 1946. Here he was coordinating officer for Road Repairs and Public Utility Services during the period 1939–1945. He was knighted in 1942 for his direction of the repair services that enabled London to carry on in spite of severe air raids. He is credited with having organised and put to action "rapid response" teams who repaired upwards of a hundred breaches in the Thames wall, thus preventing low-lying areas of London from being flooded, an achievement that, for reasons of protecting "the public's morale," was kept secret during the war.

He died in 1951 aged 70, and is buried at Putney Vale Cemetery.

On 29 October 2014 a commemorative green plaque, funded by the Institution of Civil Engineers, was unveiled by the Lord Mayor of Westminster in his memory. It is located on a section of the Thames embankment wall in Victoria Tower Gardens, close to the Houses of Parliament, one of the most important locations where Frank organised repairs to bomb damage.

Professional and academic associations
Preceded by Francis Wentworth-Shields	President of the Institution of Civil Engineers; November 1945 – November 1946	Succeeded by William Halcrow
