= Patrick Meik =

English civil engineer (1851–1910)

Patrick Walter Meik (1851 – 12 July 1910) was an English civil engineer and part of a minor dynasty. His father Thomas Meik was also an engineer, as was his younger brother Charles Meik.

== Early career ==
Both boys were born in Crowtree Road, Bishopwearmouth, Sunderland. Meik was educated at King’s College School, London, and at the University of Edinburgh, after which he joined his father's practice for three years' pupillage from 1868 to 1871. He then worked for John Aird & Co., employed on projects including the East London Waterworks at Sunbury and the Imperial Gasworks at Bromley.

== Later career ==
In 1873, Meik went to work for his father and worked on Meik's harbours at Burntisland (where he was resident engineer on the West Dock) and at Bo'ness on the River Forth in Scotland before being asked by Sir Benjamin Baker to be resident engineer (1882–1885) on the foundations and piers of the Forth Bridge (designed by Baker and Sir John Fowler). After this project, he moved to London and set up an office for his father's engineering practice, now known as Thomas Meik and Sons. He worked on a rail project at Lee-on-the-Solent during this time.

In 1894, he was joined by his brother Charles and together they worked on a major commission to construct docks and a railway at Port Talbot, followed by an equally ambitious scheme to expand the port of Seaham, officially opened in 1905, and the King’s Dock at Swansea, which was opened in 1909. The Meiks' expertise saw port and railway designs developed in many parts of the British Empire, including Christmas Island, India, Singapore, Burma (the Rangoon River training works – where Patrick worked with Sir George Buchanan) and Mozambique.

In the 1900s, their firm was commissioned to design the Kinlochleven hydroelectric scheme in the Scottish Highlands. William Halcrow joined the company and took up the position of assistant resident engineer at the Kinlochleven project. The Meik brothers' engineering practice was later renamed CS Meik and Halcrow and became one of the world's foremost engineering consultancies, the Halcrow Group (in 2005, the Edinburgh office of the Halcrow group bought Forth Bridge drawings originally created by Patrick Meik over 120 years earlier).

Patrick Meik died in London in 1910, mourned as "an able and accomplished engineer: whose kindness of heart and social qualities endeared him to a large circle of friends".
