= William Halcrow =

English civil engineer (1883–1958)

Sir William Halcrow
- Born: 4 July 1883; Bishopwearmouth, Tyne and Wear, England
- Died: 31 October 1958 (aged 75)
- Engineering career
- Discipline: Civil,
- Institutions: Institution of Civil Engineers (president)

Sir William Halcrow (4 July 1883 – 31 October 1958) was one of the most notable English civil engineers of the 20th century, particularly renowned for his expertise in the design of tunnels and for projects during the Second World War.

== Early years ==
Halcrow was born in Bishopwearmouth, Sunderland, (at 9 Shakespeare Terrace) at a time when Sunderland was the site of extensive railway and harbour developments.

He joined the London-based firm of PW and CS Meik as a pupil (coincidentally, engineering brothers Patrick Meik and Charles Meik were also born in Bishopwearmouth) in the early 1900s and one of his earliest projects was the Kinlochleven hydroelectric scheme in the Western Highlands of Scotland, where he worked as assistant resident engineer.

In 1910 he left the firm to gain overseas experience (working on construction of the King George V Dock in Singapore). During World War I, back in Scotland, he was in charge of the construction of the Invergordon naval base and for defences at Scapa Flow in the Orkney Islands.

== Lochaber ==
After a brief return to Singapore to work on the Johor–Singapore Causeway (c.1919), he returned to rejoin Charles Meik and work on the design of the Lochaber hydroelectric scheme. When Meik died in 1923, the delivery of this ambitious project (which involved boring a main tunnel 5m in diameter and 24 km long under the northern edge of the Ben Nevis massif, and creating a series of dams and reservoirs) was left in Halcrow's hands; that same year, the firm was renamed CS Meik and Halcrow.

== Wartime exploits ==
His responsibilities extended to tunnels under Whitehall and tunnels for the Post Office and telecommunications.

The knowledge he had gained at Lochaber was to prove invaluable as the Second World War approached and the transport authorities sought to protect the London Underground system from flooding. He also helped design deep air raid shelters, eight of which were attached to existing stations such as Goodge Street tube station (which also housed a signals centre used by General Eisenhower to direct the D-Day landings in Normandy in 1944).

Halcrow's expertise was also used in preparatory works at the Manod slate quarry in north Wales, used to keep treasures from the National Gallery, London safe from enemy air raids. His firm was also involved in designing the reinforced concrete caissons used for the Mulberry Harbours employed after D-Day in northern France, while his knowledge of dam construction was used by Barnes Wallis to help perfect the 'bouncing bomb' used in the famous Operation Chastise or Dam Busters raids of July 1943.

== Peace-time expansion ==
After the war, Halcrow's attention once again turned to Scotland. Instead of generating power for aluminium production, the North of Scotland Hydro-Electric Board proposed a new generation of hydroelectric schemes to generate power for public consumption. The Glen Affric scheme, started in 1947, was the biggest, but there were equally impressive projects in neighbouring catchments such as Glen Garry and Glen Moriston – the latter including one of the first underground power stations in the UK – and Strathfarrar and Kilmorack.

In Wales, the Halcrow firm's attention also turned to water supply projects. The Claerwen dam opened in 1952 and, later, the Clywedog dam, helped create reservoirs to supply the towns and cities of the English West Midlands. Halcrow was also instrumental in persuading the UK government to set up a hydraulics research laboratory at Wallingford in Oxfordshire, while his colleagues were designing railway tunnels at Potters Bar (1955) and the earlier Woodhead Tunnel (1954) and starting work on the new Victoria line underground line beneath central London.

Overseas, Halcrow led the company to work on a wide range of engineering projects, from roads, bridges and harbours in Ghana, Libya and Mozambique to dams in Venezuela and a power station in Buenos Aires.

== The Halcrow legacy ==
Halcrow was knighted in 1944, and elected as President of the Institution of Civil Engineers in 1946. He retired in the late 1950s and died in Folkestone, Kent in 1958.

The firm, renamed WT Halcrow and Partners in 1941 and Sir William Halcrow and Partners in 1944, was known in the early 21st century as Halcrow Group Limited. On 10 November 2011, the firm was acquired by the American consultant CH2M Hill; in 2017 CH2M was acquired by Jacobs Engineering Group.

Professional and academic associations
Preceded by Thomas Pierson Frank	President of the Institution of Civil Engineers; November 1946 – November 1947	Succeeded by Roger Gaskell Hetherington
