= Charles Meik =

English engineer (1853–1923)

Charles Scott Meik (1853 – 5 July 1923) was an English civil and mechanical engineer, and part of a minor engineering dynasty. His father Thomas Meik was also a civil engineer, as was Charles' brother Patrick Meik; collectively, they established a company which became one of the UK's major engineering consultancies.

== Early career ==
Both brothers were born in Crow Tree Road, Bishopwearmouth. For three years from 1870, Charles Meik was an apprentice at Leith-based Hawthorne & Co, after which he spent two years in William Armstrong's Elswick engine works.

After three years (1875–1878) working for the borough engineer of Hull on riverside improvements, he became assistant to Sir Thomas Bouch. However, Bouch's career was finished by the Tay Bridge disaster on 28 December 1879 in east Scotland when the 13 high girders forming the central part of the bridge crashed into the river carrying a train and 75 men, women and children with it.

In 1881, Charles Meik entered the office of Thomas Meik and Sons, as chief assistant, and was taken into partnership in 1882, working on the design and construction of dock and harbour works until 1887. He then went to Japan and worked as Chief Engineer of Harbours and Rivers for the Japanese government, returning to work in London with his brother Patrick in 1894.

== PW & CS Meik ==
After Thomas Meik retired in 1888, his firm (renamed Thomas Meik & sons) had passed into the hands of his sons, and in 1896, it was renamed PW Meik and CS Meik.

Charles then assisted Patrick on the firm's first venture into Wales, a massive commission to construct docks and a railway at Port Talbot for the Port Talbot Railway and Docks Company, followed by an equally ambitious scheme to expand the port of Seaham, officially opened in 1905. The Meiks' expertise saw port and railway designs developed in many parts of the British Empire, including Christmas Island, India, Burma and Mozambique.

The firm was then commissioned to design the Kinlochleven hydroelectric scheme in the Scottish Highlands. This was a huge undertaking at the time and it was to lead to an even greater hydroelectric project, the Lochaber Water Power Scheme. Meik died before construction started, leaving the project's completion in the hands of William Halcrow (the firm name later changed to CS Meik and Halcrow, and later traded as the Halcrow Group). Meik is remembered on the family memorial in Duddingston Kirkyard.
