= Father figure =

Male considered a role model or a confidant to a younger person

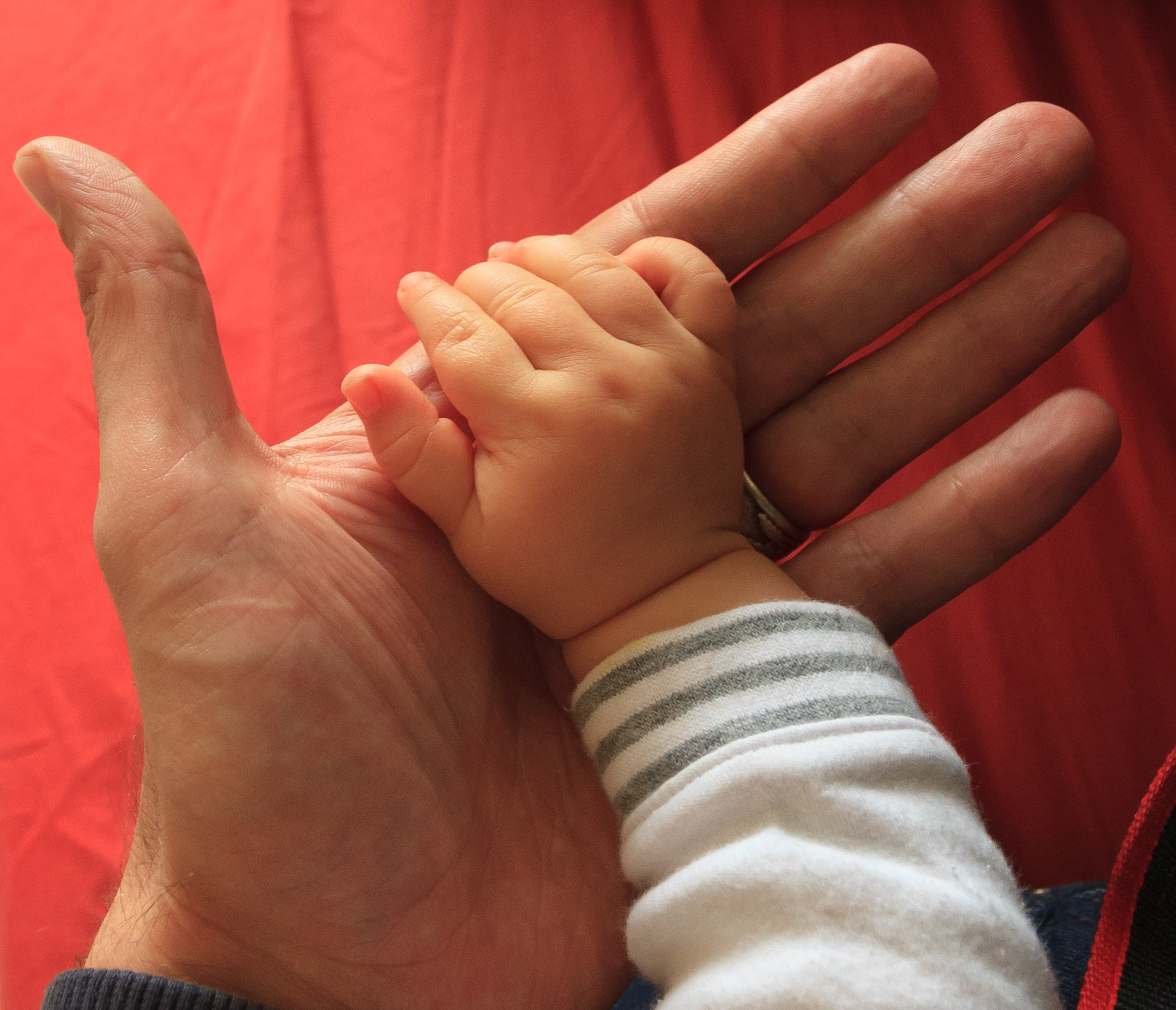
Father figure and baby

A father figure is usually an older man, normally one with power, authority, or strength, with whom one can identify on a deeply psychological level and who generates emotions generally felt towards one's father. The role of a father figure is not limited to a person's biological parent, but may be filled by uncles, grandfathers, elder brothers, family friends, or other role models. The similar term mother figure refers to an older woman.

Several studies have suggested that positive father figures and mother figures (whether biological or not) are generally associated with healthy child development, both in boys and in girls.

== Definition ==
The International Dictionary of Psychology defines "father figure" as "a man to whom a person looks up and whom he treats like a father." The APA Concise Dictionary of Psychology offers a more extensive definition: "a substitute for a person's biological father, who performs typical paternal functions and serves as an object of identification and attachment. [Father figures] may include such individuals as adoptive fathers, stepfathers, older brothers, teachers and others." This dictionary goes on to state that the term is synonymous with father surrogate and surrogate father. The former definition suggests that the term applies to any man, while the latter excludes biological fathers.

== Significance in child development ==
As a primary caregiver, a father or father-figure fills a key role in a child's life. Attachment theory offers some insight into how children relate to their fathers, and when they seek out a separate "father figure". According to a 2010 study by Posada and Kaloustian, the way that an infant models their attachment to their caregiver has a direct impact on how the infant responds to other people. These attachment-driven responses may persist throughout life.

Studies by Parke and Clark-Stewart (2011) and Lamb (2010) have shown that fathers are more likely than mothers to engage in rough-and-tumble play with children.

Other functions a father figure can provide include: helping establish personal boundaries between mother and child; promoting self-discipline, teamwork and a sense of gender identity; offering a window into the wider world; and providing opportunities for both idealization and its realistic working-through.

== Absence ==
Studies have shown that a lack of a father figure in a child's life can have severe negative psychological impacts upon a child's personality and psychology, whereas positive father figures have a significant role in a child's development.

Research found that there is a strong negative causal effect of father figure absence on a child’s social emotional development, specifically an increase in externalizing behaviors. Further, if absence occurred in early childhood, effects are more pronounced for boys than girls. Proceeding into adolescence, there is also strong evidence that father figure absence increases adolescent risk behaviors, such as substance use, early sexual activity, and teenage pregnancy. There is a strong and consistent finding on the negative effects of absence on highschool graduation, resulting in a lower graduation rate. There is little evidence supporting that the absence of a father figure has an effect on children and adolescent’s cognitive ability.

Through examining long-term effects of father figure absence on adulthood, there is strong evidence that there is a strong causal effect of father absence on adult mental health. Results denote that psychological harm due to father figure absence in childhood persists throughout life. There is also weak evidence supporting that father figure absence influences adult financial or family outcomes. A few studies indicated that there is a negative correlation on adult employment. There is inconsistent evidence supporting that there are negative effects on marriage and divorce, income, or college education.

== In psychoanalytic theory ==
From a psychoanalytic point of view, Sigmund Freud described the father figure as essential in child development, specially in pre-Oedipal and Oedipal stages. Particularly for boys, resolution of the Oedipal stage and development through developing a loving attachment with the father figure is crucial and healthy. In Freud’s theory, boys perceived father figures as a rival, a figure causing them to experience guilt and fear, ceases incestuous sexual impulses, and an object of enmity and hatred. Dorothy Burlingham also mentioned that Freud perceived father figures in a more positive light, idealizing the figure as a "protector" who is "great" and "God like" in the child’s perspective.

== Examples in history and popular culture ==
- Leaders such as Franklin D. Roosevelt have been seen as acting as father figures for their followers, while a similar role may be played by the therapist in the transference.
- Lord Durham adopted his father-in-law, Charles Grey, as a father-figure, the consequent ambivalence in their relationship impacting negatively on their work for the Great Reform Act.
- Harry Potter has been seen as seeking a succession of father figures, from Rubeus Hagrid to Albus Dumbledore, contrasted from the role of Lord Voldemort as the counterpart and negative aspect of the father figure.
- Kingsley Martin said of Leonard Woolf that "he was always ready to advise me, and became, I think, something of a Father Figure to me".

== See also ==
- Father complex
- Mentor
- Paternal bond
- Responsible fatherhood
- Social father
- Wise old man
