= Paternal bond =

Bond with the father and his child

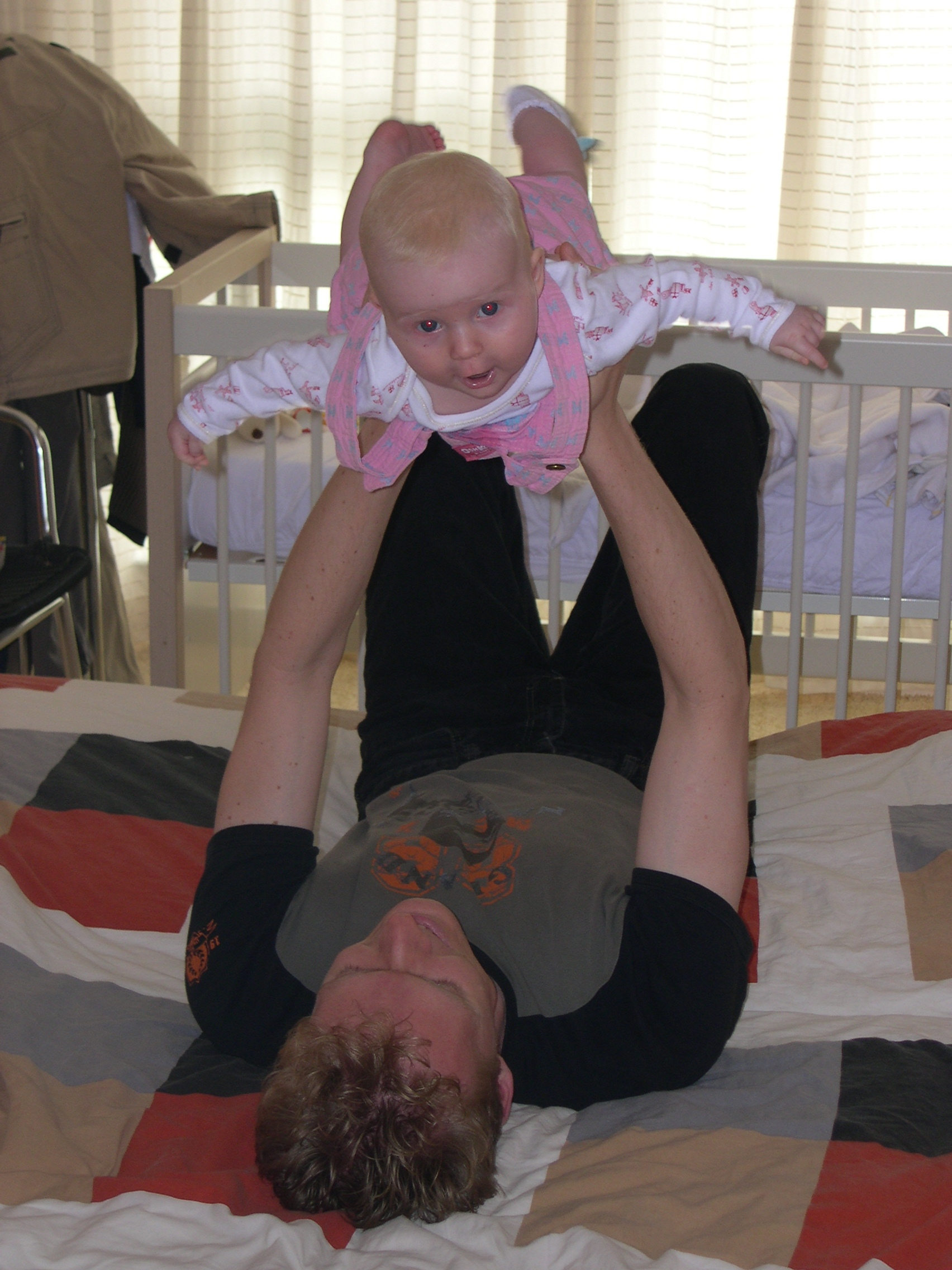
A father playing with his baby girl

A paternal bond is the human bond between a father and his child.

== Father-infant bonding ==
Infants can become attached to their fathers. Mother-infant bonding has been a common focus in household research; however, more studies in the United States and Europe have been focused on the details of father-children attachments. In the book, Gender in cross-cultural perspective, Barry Hewlett showed that infants do create bonds with their fathers. She explained how recently born children bond with their fathers at similar ages during development. Researchers question how father-infant bonding occurs because fatherhood has many different roles in various cultures. Questions arise about how fathers have the ability to bond with children if they do not have the same kind of role that mothers do in the baby's development.

The father of a child can develop the bond during the pregnancy of his partner, feeling attachment to the developing child. Research indicates that this may have some biological basis. Statistics show that fathers' levels of testosterone tend to decline several months before the birth of the child. Since high testosterone levels are linked to more aggressive behaviour, low levels may enhance the ability to develop a new relationship bond.

Fathers also have an important bonding role after the child is born. Fathers find many ways to strengthen the father-child bond with their children, such as soothing, consoling, feeding (expressed breast milk, infant formula, or baby food), changing diapers, bathing, dressing, playing, and cuddling. Carrying the infant in a sling or backpack or pushing them in a baby transport can build the bond, as can participating in the baby's bedtime routine. These are broad activities that fathers share to develop their father-infant bond. Fathers also have specific bonding roles that develop from their different cultures and societies.

=== European and American culture ===
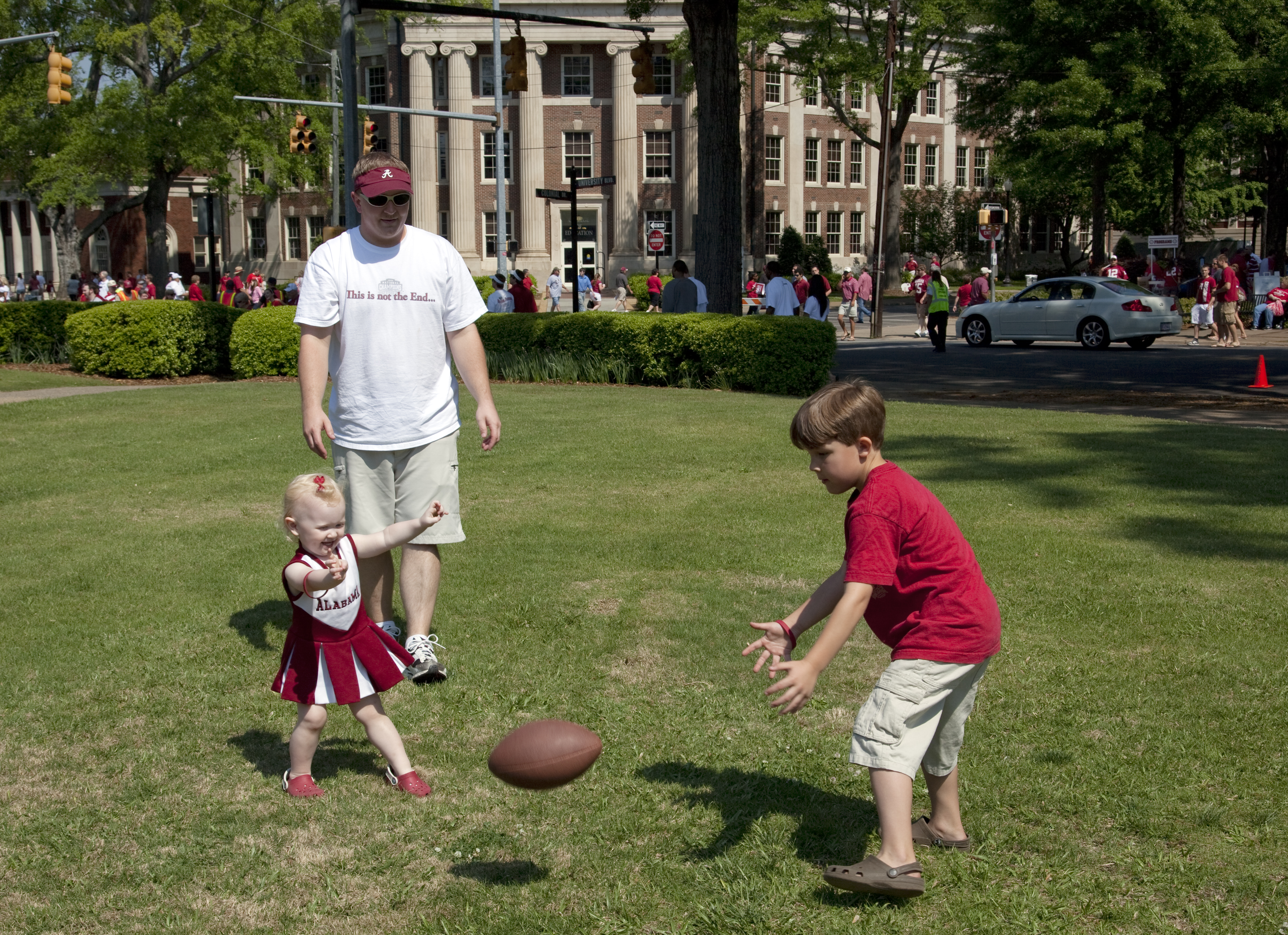
An American father playing with his son and daughter during a tailgate party. Outings such as sports events often allow for fathers to bond with their children over hobbies and activities.

European and American fathers are seen to have more of an aggressive and vigorous relationship with their child. This does not mean harmful; however, it means there is physical and highly stimulating interaction between the father and child. This gave the child emotions that reflected an exhilarating and fun-loving experience that allowed them to create a father-infant bond different from a mother-infant bond. It is shown that an infant's facial expressions and emotions towards their father is significantly different from their emotions towards their mothers, even at a very young age. This shows that a father being present gives the child a variety in the way they interact with different people.

A father playing poker with his son, October 1938.

The roughhousing does not just have importance towards the bonds the children make with the father, but also helps to teach them life lessons. Rough play helps to teach self control, helps children understand appropriate social roles, helps them realize when certain emotions should be used, and helps them understand others emotions and facial expressions. This form of bonding between the father and infant creates a bond that is unique. It allows the child to learn valuable lessons, while also being in an environment that enhances all of their senses and allows them to intensify their relationship with their father.

=== Aka culture ===
The Aka are a hunter-gatherer society in the southern Central African Republic and northern Congo-Brazzaville. The way they form their father-infant bond is very different from that of the Europeans and Americans. While Europeans and Americans focus on rough playing, the Aka's do not allow this high stimulating environment to develop with their children. Aka fathers are always around their infants when they are born. They always sleep with their infants and are always in close proximity of them for more than half a day. Overall, Aka fathers are more relaxed and intimate during fatherhood than those in the United States.

The four factors that are key for Aka father-infant bonding:

1. Understanding the infant: Aka fathers are around the child more than most cultures. They hold the child often; therefore, they learn important signs the child shows that most fathers would not. For example, they understand signs that show when the child is hungry or sick.
2. Understanding fatherhood practices: Fathers understand when to be more playful, when to be more physical, how to correctly hold a child, and how to calm them down. They understand all of the interactions that are needed to take good care of a child.
3. Connecting with the infant: The father understands how to make a bond with the infant. They know if the infant needs more rough play or soothing. They play large roles in caretaking, so they understand the infants needs at another level.
4. Representing the culture and fatherhood goals: The Aka's are hunter-gatherers; therefore, animal hunting is not a sufficient or main way that they obtain food. This means that the males do not play a main role in going out and hunting for the tribe or their own families. This allows the father to be able to spend more time with the infant and really create a bond with them. This makes a father's role in child upbringing an important aspect of the Aka culture.

The Aka foragers in the Central African Republic do not hunt with bows. Their main source of hunting is through nets. In Hillary N. Fouts cross-cultural research, she had statistical data that supported the claim that different roles in foraging populations had an impact on the amount of time a father spent with their children. Fouts took different foraging populations in Africa and compared their type of hunting and the percentage of time these fathers were seen holding their child. Her first foraging group was the Aka population. They were a net hunting group that held their children aged 1–4 months 22% of the day, held their children 8–12 months 11.2% of the day, and held their children 13–18 months 14.3% of the day. The other net hunting population was the Bofi. They had fathers hold babies aged from 36-47 and 48–59 months for 5.4% of the day.

In contrast, the foraging groups that participated in bow hunting had fathers hold babies for significantly less time. The Hadza foraging population had fathers hold babies from the ages 0–9 months for only 2.5% of the day. The other bow hunting foragers, the !Kung, had fathers hold babies from 0–6 months for 1.9% of the day and babies 6–24 months 4.0% of the day.

This statistical data shows that different roles in a society influences how much time the father spends holding and interacting with his children. This is important because it shows that each culture is different regarding father upbringings and father bonding.

== Legal paternity ==
=== United States ===
In the U.S., legal paternity is presumed for the husband of the mother unless a separate action is taken; an unmarried man may establish paternity by signing a voluntary recognition of paternity or by taking court action. Paternity may also be established between a man and a younger person, commonly in adoption, without the two being biologically related.

== See also ==
- Cinderella effect
- Fathers as attachment figures
- Fathers' rights movement
- Maternal bond
- Parental leave
- Personal relationship
- Responsible fatherhood
- Shared Earning/Shared Parenting Marriage
