= Suburban Secrets =

- Genre: Documentary
- Created by: Susan Horowetz & Aliza Rosen
- Narrated by: Nicole Blackman
- Composer: Craig Sharmat
- Country of origin: United States
- Original language: English
- No. of seasons: 2
- No. of episodes: 36

Production
- Executive producers: Rebecca Toth Diefenbach; Valerie Haselton
- Producers: Jake Laufer; Jennifer Anderson; Walker Lamond; Carolyn Day
- Production location: United States
- Editors: Sumithrin David; David Kratz; Scott Snider
- Camera setup: Marcus Burnett; Rob Featherstone

Original release
- Network: truTV
- Release: January 9, 2007 – November 14, 2008

Suburban Secrets is a 2007 American non-fiction television series created by truTV. It is produced by Sirens Media. The show is described as being a cross between City Confidential and Desperate Housewives.

Some cities that the show has documented:

- Pleasant Garden, North Carolina
- Grapevine, Texas
- Aliquippa, Pennsylvania
- Little Compton, Rhode Island
- Marion, Virginia
- Red Bluff, California
- Bridgton, Maine
- Olathe, Kansas

Notable cases documented:

- Sarah Marie Johnson (Idaho)
- Christopher McCowen (Massachusetts)
- Hope Schreiner (Vermont)
- Rachelle Waterman (Alaska)
- Diane King (Michigan)
- Mark Mangelsdorf and Melinda Harmon Raisch (Kansas)
