= Tommy Le Noir =

Thomas E. Le Noir is a Law Enforcement Officer who served 29 years with the Arlington Police Department in Arlington, Texas. He retired from the Arlington Police Department in 2010., Le Noir worked more than 24 years in the department's Homicide Division, solving murders.

== Early life ==
Le Noir was born in Bryan, Texas but spent his early years in Belle Chasse, Louisiana, part of the New Orleans metropolitan area. As a teenager, Le Noir's family returned to Texas, settling in Arlington. Le Noir graduated with a Bachelor of Science in criminal justice from the University of Texas at Arlington.

Le Noir himself credits his career in the law enforcement field to his father. Aside from serving in the military, Le Noir's father was a heavyweight professional boxer who was a natural "protector" of not only his family and friends, but of anyone he felt was being abused or mistreated.

== Police career ==
Le Noir joined the Arlington Police Department in 1980 in the patrol division and in two years earned a spot in the narcotics division and focused on undercover work. Three years later, Le Noir was selected to join the homicide division and was responsible for securing numerous capital convictions.

During his distinguished law enforcement career, Detective Le Noir has earned an impressive 80 commendations, 12 departmental awards, his Master Police Officer State Certification, the Distinguished Service Medal and elite honor of "Officer of the Year." A black belt in martial arts since 1975, Detective Le Noir pioneered the Arlington Police Academy's now required program in defensive tactics. He is also a certified instructor in basic and advanced courses in Homicide Investigation, Cold Case Homicide Investigation, Investigation in Police Involved Shootings and Use of Deadly Force, and Advanced Interrogation to outside police agencies at the North Texas Regional Police Academy while lecturing to colleges, high schools, civic groups and the Arlington Citizen Police Academy.

Several of Le Noir's homicide cases have earned national media attention – having been featured on A&E's Cold Case Files, Dick Wolf's Arrest & Trial and Court TV's Forensic Files among others. One of Le Noir's most famous cases was that of serial killer Jack Reeves, which has been featured in eight different documentary programs including HBO's America Undercover: Autopsy series and the subject of the book Mail Order Murder by true crime author Patricia Springer.

Presently, Le Noir continues to serve as a Criminal Investigator with the Dallas County District Attorney's Office. He is often called on to teach homicide investigation at the regional police academy, and lecture at universities while pursuing a second career in the entertainment venue. He has served in a consulting capacity on such shows as Rescue 911, and as the host for Murder, a Bunim-Murray Production that premiered on Spike TV in 2007.

== Family life ==
Le Noir resides in Burleson, Texas with his wife and three daughters.
