= Solved (TV series) =

American true crime television series

- Genre: True crime
- Narrated by: Kathleen Garrett
- Country of origin: United States
- Original language: English
- No. of seasons: 3
- No. of episodes: 32

Production
- Executive producers: Robert Kirk; Rob Lihani
- Producers: David Cargill; Nino Lopez; Joseph Peicott; Patrick Shea; Brian Runnels; David Connelly
- Running time: 60 minutes

Original release
- Network: ID
- Release: October 13, 2008 – September 21, 2010

Solved is an American true crime television series that airs on the Investigation Discovery network. The show also aired on TLC. Debuting on October 13, 2008, Solved is produced in conjunction with Digital Ranch Productions.

== Synopsis ==
The series features career-defining cases of police officers and FBI agents, with a heavy emphasis on forensic evidence. In each episode, a mysterious homicide case unfolds through first person accounts from America's elite law enforcement officers.

Topics covered include forensic document examination, forensic linguistics, and computer forensics.

CGI environments are used to illustrate crime scenes, physical evidence, and various high-tech crime fighting techniques.

== Season 1 (2008) ==
No. overall	No. in season	Title	Location	Original release date
1	1	The Devil Within	Bellevue, Idaho	October 13, 2008
16-year-old Sarah Johnson runs to her neighbor's house screaming an intruder has shot her parents. Sarah says she never saw the intruder and has no idea who would want them dead.
2	2	An Eye for Murder	Tucson, Arizona	October 20, 2008
Brian Stidham a popular ophthalmologist, is found murdered in the parking lot of his office. Investigators focus on his former partner: Bradley Schwartz.
3	3	Minister of Murder	San Diego	October 27, 2008
When 23-year-old Joy Risker goes missing, her husband says she grew tired of their marriage and ran off to Europe. But the San Diego Police Department believes otherwise.
4	4	Old Habits Die Hard	Buford, Georgia	November 3, 2008
When 33-year-old Jennifer Corbin is discovered shot to death in her home, all signs point to suicide. Until police learn about a similar death a decade prior in Augusta, Georgia.
5	5	Blood Money	Los Angeles	November 10, 2008
A man receives a call which claims his son, Alexander Umansky has been kidnapped with just one week to live unless the family pays a $230,000 ransom. FBI Agents follow the money trail overseas and uncover a ruthless international kidnapping ring.
6	6	Secrets and Bombs	Salt Lake City	November 17, 2008
Utah is rocked by a series of package bombings leaving two people dead. The 3rd victim, Mark Hofmann survives the bombing. But the story he tells investigators, doesn't jibe with what explosives experts know.
7	7	Behind Closed Doors	New Cumberland, Pennsylvania	November 24, 2008
In March 2004, Brian Hummert reports his wife Charlene missing, but within hours’ police find her dead body in her abandoned vehicle. Soon a killer letter admits responsibility for her murder, but the evidence suggests otherwise.
8	8	The Watch Man	Clearwater, Florida	December 1, 2008
Bernadette Myers is attacked and murdered in her home. When the crime scene yields no physical evidence and no likely suspects, investigators have a complete whodunit on their hands.
9	9	Broken Vows	Chesapeake, Virginia	December 8, 2010
In May 2004, three matching suitcases containing male body parts surface off the coast. Investigators gather circumstantial against the victim's wife: Melanie McGuire. They must prove she is capable of the gruesome murder of her husband.
10	10	Shattered Silence	Round Rock, Texas	December 15, 2008
35-year-old Christina Moore is found murdered in her home. Police suspect the husband because there is no sign of forced entry. Six months into their investigation, detectives get a surprise tip that blows the case wide open.
11	11	The Dark Side	Redlands, California	December 22, 2008
18-year-old Kelly Bullwinkle has suddenly disappeared. Three weeks later, her remains are found in a make-shift grave. During their investigation, detectives find her online journal, which reveals a teenage love triangle full of conflict.
12	12	Burden of Proof	Farmersville, Texas	December 29, 2008
Rachelle Tolleson disappears, leaving her infant daughter alone in the house. Days later her body is found burned in a remote area. Suspicion falls on the husband, but there may be another person of interest.
13	13	Grave Danger	West Monroe, Louisiana	January 16, 2009
The parents of a 29-year-old Stephanie Pepper Sims alert police when she goes missing. Investigators focus their attention on the victim's estranged husband, but friends say there was another man in her life.

== Season 2 (2009) ==
No. overall	No. in season	Title	Location	Original release date
14	1	Written in Blood	Oldsmar, Florida	July 20, 2009
Tim Permenter finds his girlfriend, Karen Pannell's lifeless body lying in a pool of blood. Police find the word "Roc" on a wall near her body written in blood. But did Karen write the words herself?
15	2	Gone But Not Forgotten	Lubbock, Texas	July 27, 2009
29-year-old Summer Baldwin is found dead inside of a suitcase. Surveillance shows Rosendo Rodriguez buying the exact same suitcase. As detectives build their case, they learn she might not be his only victim.
16	3	Impediment to Riches	Fresno, California	August 3, 2009
Three family members are shot to death in their home. With a long list of potential suspects, investigators spend three years analyzing every piece of the puzzle and make an arrest that shocks everyone: Dana Ewell.
17	4	Truth in Shadows	West Manchester Township, Pennsylvania	August 10, 2009
The body of Jennifer Myers is found in her art and frame shop. Investigators determine the 44-year-old mother of two died of multiple gunshot wounds. With little evidence, detectives soon uncover an alarming link between Jennifer and her killer.
18	5	A Test of Time	Roebuck, South Carolina	August 17, 2009
Dana Satterfield is found strangled to death in the back room of her beauty salon. A solid alibi clears Dana's husband of any suspicion. As other leads are exhausted, the case turns cold, until an individual comes forward with a dark secret.
19	6	The Green Dragon	Bradford, Ohio	August 24, 2009
A four-year-old boy runs to his church and tell volunteers his grandparents are "melting." Police find the boy's great-grandparents dead from shotgun blasts. Detectives spend several days reviewing suspects until a tip breaks the case wide open.
20	7	Sin	Hellertown, Pennsylvania	August 31, 2009
Early one morning, a church employee arrives to work and trips on a woman's body. The pastor of the church suspects it could have been a random killing, Further questioning leads detectives to suspect another member: Mary Jane Fonder.
21	8	Betrayal	Des Moines, Washington	September 7, 2009
Ronald Whitehead murdered during a carjacking. A long trail of clues leads detectives back to Ronald's doorstep with a member of his family suspected of masterminding the killing.
22	9	No Way Out	Spartanburg, South Carolina	October 19, 2009
Caught on surveillance video, Rhonda Ward-Goodwin is seen forced into her car by an unknown man and driven away. With little evidence, detectives do not have much to go on, until Rhonda's car is found engulfed in flames a week later.
33	10	Last Man Standing	Virginia Beach, Virginia	October 26, 2009
Paramedics respond to a horrific crime scene – a woman is found tied to a bed with slashes across her body. Next to her on the floor, a man with three gunshot wounds. Detectives spend the next several years unraveling this bizarre mystery.
24	11	Life and Death	Cameron, Missouri	November 2, 2009
Bobbie Jo Stinnett is found strangled to death in her home. Known to be eight months pregnant, paramedics are shocked to find that Bobbie Jo's fetus has been removed through a crude cesarean section. Investigators race to find the newborn.
25	12	Poisoned by Love	Onondaga, New York	November 9, 2009
After David Castor is found dead from poisoning. His wife Stacey Castor is suspected of crafting the murder plot. The investigation takes an unexpected twist when she attempts to kill her daughter.
26	13	Lost Decades	Woods Cross, Utah	November 16, 2009
In 1980, Karin Strom is found strangled to death. A seemingly open and shut case turns into a 26-year mystery. DNA taken from three prime suspects is compared to evidence recovered from the victim. The results are startling.

== Season 3 (2010) ==
No. overall	No. in season	Title	Location	Original release date
27	1	The Prodigy	Portsmouth, Virginia	July 26, 2010
In 2008, 16-year-old Meghan Landowski is found stabbed to death. A seemingly open and shut case turns into a months' long "who done it?" Police eliminate suspects in their hunt for the girl's killer.
28	2	Time for Justice	Luverne, Minnesota	August 2, 2010
In 2001, 20-year-old ranger Carrie Nelson is found beaten to death in a park office. The senseless killing turns into a five-year long "whodunit?" Investigators turn to science as they track down an elusive and unlikely killer.
3	3	Bike Path Killer	Buffalo, New York	August 9, 2010
For eight years, the Bike Path Rapist terrorized women. Then, without explanation, the attacks stopped. After a 12-year absence, he resurfaces. Using new technologies detectives are able to identify the culprit: Altemio Sanchez.
29	4	The Bully	Redlands, California	August 16, 2010
Human remains found in a sewer are identified as Tristan Jensen, a 14-year-old boy who was reported missing. Investigators find it hard to believe that another teenager could be the prime suspect.
30	5	The Watcher	Edmond, Oklahoma	August 23, 2010
A suburban town is rocked by the stabbing murder of 27-year-old Gary Larson. The attacker leaves a trail of bloody footprints in his house. Investigators must follow the footsteps to catch the killer.
32	6	The Rivalry	Jacksonville, Florida	August 30, 2010
25-year-old waitress Corey Parker is found dead in her apartment bedroom with over 100 stab wounds to her body. After two long years of intense investigation, detectives finally zero in on a suspect. But the killer knows he's being watched.

== See also ==
- Cold Case Files, USA/A&E, 1999 (true cases)
- Cold Justice, USA/TNT, 2013 (true cases)
- To Catch a Killer, CAN/OWN, 2014 (true cases)
