= Murder (American TV program) =

- Starring: Tommy Le Noir
- Country of origin: United States
- No. of seasons: 1
- No. of episodes: 10

Production
- Running time: 42 minutes
- Production company: Bunim/Murray Productions

Original release
- Network: SpikeTV
- Release: July 31 – October 9, 2007

Murder is an American ten-episode reality television competition program which premiered on Spike TV on July 31, 2007. Because of explicit photos of corpses and gruesome materials, the series is not suitable for children under 16. After the second airing, the show moved from 10:00 PM to midnight. The final episode aired on October 9, 2007.

== Summary ==
Two teams of civilians investigate a real crime scene and have 48 hours before they must present their findings to detective Tommy Le Noir, after which Le Noir describes what happened at the actual crime scene, how the real investigators came up with their findings. He evaluates the teams and tells them how well they conducted their investigation. The prize is a donation made to a victim's charity.

== Episodes ==
The following is the listing of the episodes, and the real-life murder cases on which the episodes were based:

| No. | Title | Real case episode is based on | Original release date |
|---|---|---|---|
| 1 | "Hometown Homicide" | Murders of Diane and Alan Scott Johnson by Sarah Marie Johnson in Bellevue, ID | July 31, 2007 |
| 2 | "The Bludgeoning" | Murder of David Harmon by Mark Mangelsdorf in Olathe, KS | August 7, 2007(?) |
| 3 | "Shot and Stashed" | N/A | August 14, 2007(?) |
| 4 | "Dead Stranger in the Living Room" | Murder of Donnah Winger and Roger Harrington by Mark Winger in Springfield, IL | August 21, 2007(?) |
| 5 | "Half-Naked and Dead" | Murder of "Vicki" Gillette by Ron Gillette | August 28, 2007(?) |
| 6 | "Blood Soaked" | Murder of Stephanie Crowe in Escondido, CA | September 11, 2007(?) |
| 7 | "Murder at the Inn" | Murder of James Webb by Guy Sileo in Lower Merion, PA | September 18, 2007(?) |
| 8 | "Family Massacre" | David Camm accused of murdering his family in Georgetown, IN | September 25, 2007(?) |
| 9 | "Gutted" | N/A | October 2, 2007(?) |
| 10 | "Burning Flesh… (A Special All Star Episode)" | Murder of Missy Grubaugh by Louis Arroyo in Arlington, TX | October 9, 2007 |
