= Murder of Brian Stidham =

2004 death in Arizona

Stidham

David Brian Stidham (August 13, 1967 – October 5, 2004) was a pediatric ophthalmologist stabbed to death in Catalina Foothills, Arizona as the result of a murder-for-hire plot that stemmed from a colleague's professional jealousy. Bradley Alan Schwartz, also a pediatric ophthalmologist, and Ronald Bruce Bigger, a hit man, were arrested and convicted for the murder.

== Brian Stidham ==
=== Background ===
Stidham was born and raised in Longview, Texas, the son of Mack and Joyce Stidham. Stidham began attending Harvard Medical School in 1990 and graduated in 1993. He then moved to Dallas, Texas where he entered a residency program at the University of Texas Southwestern Medical School's internal medicine department. A year later he switched to ophthalmology. While in Dallas, he met and began dating his neighbor, Daphne Herding, whom he eventually married in a garden ceremony in 1997. The couple moved to Indianapolis where Stidham undertook a fellowship in pediatric ophthalmology and adult strabismus at Indiana University. In 1998, they returned to Texas when Stidham joined the faculty at The University of Texas Health Science Center at Houston. Their first child, Alexandre Brian, was born in Houston in 2000. Their daughter, Catherine Elizabeth, was born later in Tucson in 2003.

=== Relocation to Tucson ===
In 2001, Stidham answered an ad Bradley Schwartz had placed in a trade journal seeking someone to care for the pediatric patients in his Tucson ophthalmology practice, Arizona Specialty Eye Care. Stidham was officially hired in November 2001 partly as a way to provide added support to Schwartz's booming business. Other reports suggest that Schwartz was planning to open a plastic surgery practice or, at least, another office on the north side of the city. Stidham was meant to take over the pediatric ophthalmology aspect of Schwartz's business. In December 2001, one month after Stidham joined the practice, the DEA raided the office and Schwartz was indicted by a federal grand jury on 77 counts of illegally obtaining prescription medicine. This spurred Stidham to create his own Tucson-area practice.

== Bradley Schwartz ==
=== Background ===
Bradley Alan Schwartz was born January 14, 1965 in Brooklyn, New York to Henry and Lois Schwartz. He graduated from the University of Rochester School of Medicine in 1991, and married Joan Samuels in New York City four days after his graduation. The couple subsequently had three children. He worked at a hospital in Pittsburgh, Pennsylvania prior to relocating with his family to Tucson in the late '90s. A Phoenix-based ophthalmology group had hired Schwartz to open an office in Tucson. One year later when his contract expired, the group sued him for violating a restrictive covenant when he opened his own practice less than 200 yards away. The two sides settled out of court with the Phoenix group characterizing his behavior as "obscene, abusive, and belligerent."

=== Drug abuse, DEA investigation, and indictment ===
From early 2001 to May 2004, Schwartz was involved in a romantic relationship with the foster mother of one of his patients, Pima County deputy attorney Lourdes Salomon Lopez. Schwartz had also developed a drug problem that began in 2000 when he received Vicodin for chronic back and jaw pain. He also became addicted to Ritalin. Over a two-month period during the summer of 2001, Lopez allowed Schwartz to use her name to fraudulently obtain prescriptions for the controlled substance hydrocodone. Schwartz also wrote prescriptions to his office manager, Laurie Espinoza, who would retrieve the medication and give it to Schwartz. In October 2001, two DEA agents interviewed Lopez as part of a criminal investigation involving Schwartz. Although she was instructed not to discuss their interview with Schwartz, she told Schwartz about the investigation and interview within the following 24 hours. In December 2001, DEA agents raided Schwartz's office. In September 2002, a grand jury issued a 77-count indictment on charges related to Schwartz writing Vicodin and Ritalin prescriptions for two patients (Lopez and Espinoza) who returned the drugs to him for his own use. Schwartz's wife, Joan, filed for divorce the following month. Schwartz initially pleaded guilty to the drug charges in 2003; however, the plea was withdrawn in early 2004.

In June 2003, Schwartz and Lopez were involved in a domestic altercation which resulted in an amendment to the conditions for their release, prohibiting them from having contact with each other. In November 2003, Schwartz was placed on five years' probation by the Arizona Medical Board for "unprofessional conduct." Under the terms of the probation, Schwartz was barred from writing prescriptions for narcotics, required to check in with the board each day, and subject to random drug tests. Schwartz attended rehab later that year and admitted that he had a drug problem. This occurred shortly after the Arizona Medical Board had reinstated Schwartz's license in August 2003. In March 2004, the conditions of Schwartz and Lopez's release were modified to allow the two to have contact with each other. However, the two had already been seeing each other and were even engaged to be married.

== Professional relationship severed ==
The relationship between Brian Stidham and Bradley Schwartz began to deteriorate soon after Stidham was hired in November 2001. Stidham officially served as Schwartz's associate until October 2002, when Schwartz was indicted on drug fraud charges. Stidham gave Schwartz 30 days' notice and began making plans to start his own practice across town. Stidham told friends that his partner (Schwartz) had been acting "weird" and that he needed to remove himself from the situation.

Because of the indictment, Schwartz lost his medical license and entered into rehab. When he received word that Stidham was still recruiting patients, Schwartz became angry and even directly told his girlfriend, Lourdes Lopez, and other friends that he wanted to kill Stidham. While Stidham was still under Schwartz's employ, Schwartz instructed his parents to fire Stidham. Some of Schwartz's patients went to Stidham's new practice, many of whom stayed with Stidham even when Schwartz had started practicing again. Despite the fact that Stidham's new practice was on the opposite side of town, Schwartz was convinced that his former partner was deliberately stealing his clients.

== Murder and investigation ==
On the evening of October 5, 2004, deputies of the Pima County Sheriff’s Department responded to a report of a man down in the parking lot of the North First Medical Plaza where Stidham worked. Differing reports say his body was found by either a cleaning crew or Christine Rotella, a massage therapist who had returned to the medical plaza to retrieve her forgotten engagement ring. The victim, identified as Stidham, had been stabbed 15 times and had incurred a skull fracture. He was killed in his 1992 white Lexus SC400 and dragged from his car to make it look like a robbery. The car was later found at an apartment complex over six miles away. Schwartz was the case's primary suspect from October 6 onward, the day after Stidham's murder.

On the night of the murder, Schwartz was with Lisa Goldberg, a girlfriend he had recently begun seeing after meeting her on an online dating service. Earlier in the day, Schwartz had engaged in a series of phone calls with Ronald Bruce Bigger. One of these phone calls included Bigger repeatedly asking, "Where is my money?" Conflicting reports suggest that Schwartz had either met Bigger at Narcotics Anonymous or at his medical practice. Schwartz and Goldberg were eating at a Thai restaurant in Tucson shortly after the murder occurred. Bigger reportedly met up with the two at the restaurant. Schwartz introduced him to Goldberg as "Bruce." Schwartz would later take Bigger to an automated teller machine (ATM) and then check him into a hotel. The following day after a conversation in which Schwartz denied to her that he was involved in the murder, Goldberg telephoned the police to report her suspicions and indicated that a man named "Bruce" had joined them while they were at dinner.

The investigation eventually revealed that Schwartz hired Bigger for $10,000 to help him murder Stidham. Bigger had previously been convicted of criminal recklessness, check deception, and possession of marijuana in LaPorte, Indiana and was a fugitive from that state. Schwartz was with his girlfriend in a public restaurant but there are cell phone records linking Schwartz's cell phone to a convenience store pay phone, where Bigger allegedly visited that evening, and to Bigger's hotel, which was paid for by Schwartz. A sample of DNA linked to Bigger was found on the radio knob of Stidham's car.

On October 15, police captured Bigger who was hiding just outside Tucson. They also arrested Schwartz the same night. When police arrived at his apartment, he was found naked with a woman. He was taken away with such haste that his shirt was on backwards. From jail, Schwartz pleaded with Lourdes Lopez, his former lover, to be his attorney, but she refused. On October 28, Lopez reported that, prior to the murder, she had expressed to Paul Skitzki, a county prosecutor with whom she was on friendly terms, her concerns about what Schwartz might do to Stidham. The case was transferred from Pima County to Pinal County because of the nature of Lopez's past work relationship with Pima County.

== Trials and convictions ==
Schwartz and Bigger were both charged with first-degree murder and conspiracy to commit first-degree murder. Both men also pleaded "not guilty." After some delay, the trial for Schwartz began in March 2006. Bigger's trials would not begin until the following March. Schwartz was provided with a court-appointed defense attorney named Brick Storts. Early on, Storts suggested that the attorney-client relationship between Schwartz and Lopez precluded the case from going to trial. Other arguments Storts used revolved around discrepancies between the time of death, Bigger's whereabouts, and the fact that the $10,000 had seemingly vanished.

Prosecuting attorney Sylvia Lafferty pointed to Schwartz's cell phone records, which showed that he received calls from a payphone at a Denny's across the street from Stidham's office. Schwartz's cell phone also received calls from Bigger's hotel room, which Schwartz had paid for. The nature of the phone discussions had changed over the course of the night. Schwartz began to reassure Bigger that he had his money. Lafferty also brought up the fact that Schwartz harbored a well-known grudge against Stidham. Many individuals took the stand, including ex-girlfriends, friends, colleagues, and acquaintances, many of whom confirmed that Schwartz often talked about his hatred for Stidham.

The DNA evidence from Bigger in Stidham's car also provided evidence for the prosecution. Throughout his trial, Schwartz never took the stand. He was eventually convicted and sentenced to 25 years to life in prison for conspiracy to murder Stidham. Because the jury could not make a decision on the first-degree murder charge, Schwartz would have been eligible for parole after serving 25 years (in 2029). Schwartz's trial lasted two months, and it took the jury five days to deliver a verdict. The trial officially ended on May 2, 2006.

Bigger's trial took place from March 14, 2007, to May 16, 2007. Bigger's defense attorney, Jill Thorpe, tried to prove that it was Schwartz who had actually physically committed the murder. Both the prosecution and the defense attacked Schwartz's character. Lead prosecutors Sylvia Lafferty and Richard Platt also brought in a more sophisticated DNA analysis than the one used for the Schwartz trial. The trial ended up painting Schwartz as an extremely manipulative individual, causing the jury to feel sympathy for Bigger. Nevertheless, the jury found Bigger guilty of both conspiracy to commit first-degree murder and first-degree murder itself. He was sentenced to life in prison without parole.

== Aftermath ==
Attorneys for Schwartz and Bigger filed appeals almost immediately after sentencing. Bigger's appeal suggested that he was not afforded a fair trial on account of the copious amount of media coverage surrounding the case. Despite the fact that 83% of the jury pool had been exposed to some of the pretrial media, Bigger's appeal was thrown out by the Arizona Court of Appeals in May 2011. Bruce Bigger's attorneys felt that the trial should have been moved out of Pima County due to the publicity the case received.

Schwartz has repeatedly made headlines since his imprisonment. In 2009, Schwartz claimed to have been attacked numerous times by inmates. He sustained injuries to his eye sockets and tear ducts and suffered nasal damage and facial fractures that required plastic surgery. He also noted that his vision had been permanently damaged. He, along with attorney Brick Storts, attempted to sue the state of Arizona for $750,000. Another inmate was convicted of aggravated assault for beating up Schwartz.

Schwartz's ex-fiancee, Lourdes Lopez, who resigned as prosecutor after being indicted in federal court, continued to work as a defense attorney after disciplinary action had taken place. A complaint was filed against her by the Arizona State Bar as a result of her involvement with Bradley Schwartz's drug fraud. In 2007, the Arizona Supreme Court officially disbarred her for her connection to the drug case. The result was one that reportedly pleased the state bar. She continues to work as a paralegal.

Brian Stidham's widow, Daphne Stidham, filed a wrongful death suit in 2005 against the medical complex where her husband was murdered, alleging that the conditions at the complex aided the killer. She settled that suit for an undisclosed amount. Mrs. Stidham also filed a suit in August 2005 against Pima County, Lourdes Lopez, Paul Skitzki, and county attorney Barbara LaWall. The case alleged that the parties involved could have helped prevent Brian Stidham's murder. LaWall even testified that if Skitzki or Lopez had come forward sooner, Dr. Stidham would still be alive. Although the original case sought $20 million in a claim against the county, Mrs. Stidham settled for $2.29 million in 2007. Lourdes Lopez, Barbara LaWall, and Pima County were dismissed from the suit as part of the settlement. Pima County paid the entire amount on behalf of Paul Skitzki.

== Media coverage ==
According to Bonnie Booth of the American Medical News, the rarity of physician-on-physician crime was the likely reason that the trial drew so much media attention. In addition to local media outlets, Court TV and CBS's 48 Hours provided coverage to a national audience. A.J. Flick, a reporter who covered the case for the Tucson Citizen, wrote a best-selling, true-crime book published in 2018 titled "Toxic Rage: A Tale of Murder in Tucson" (WildBlue Press). The events surrounding the 2004 murder were broadcast on the Investigation Discovery series Solved in October 2008. The events of the murder were also covered in an episode of Forensic Files titled "Office Visit", which aired on January 22, 2010, on truTV.
