= Father =

Male parent

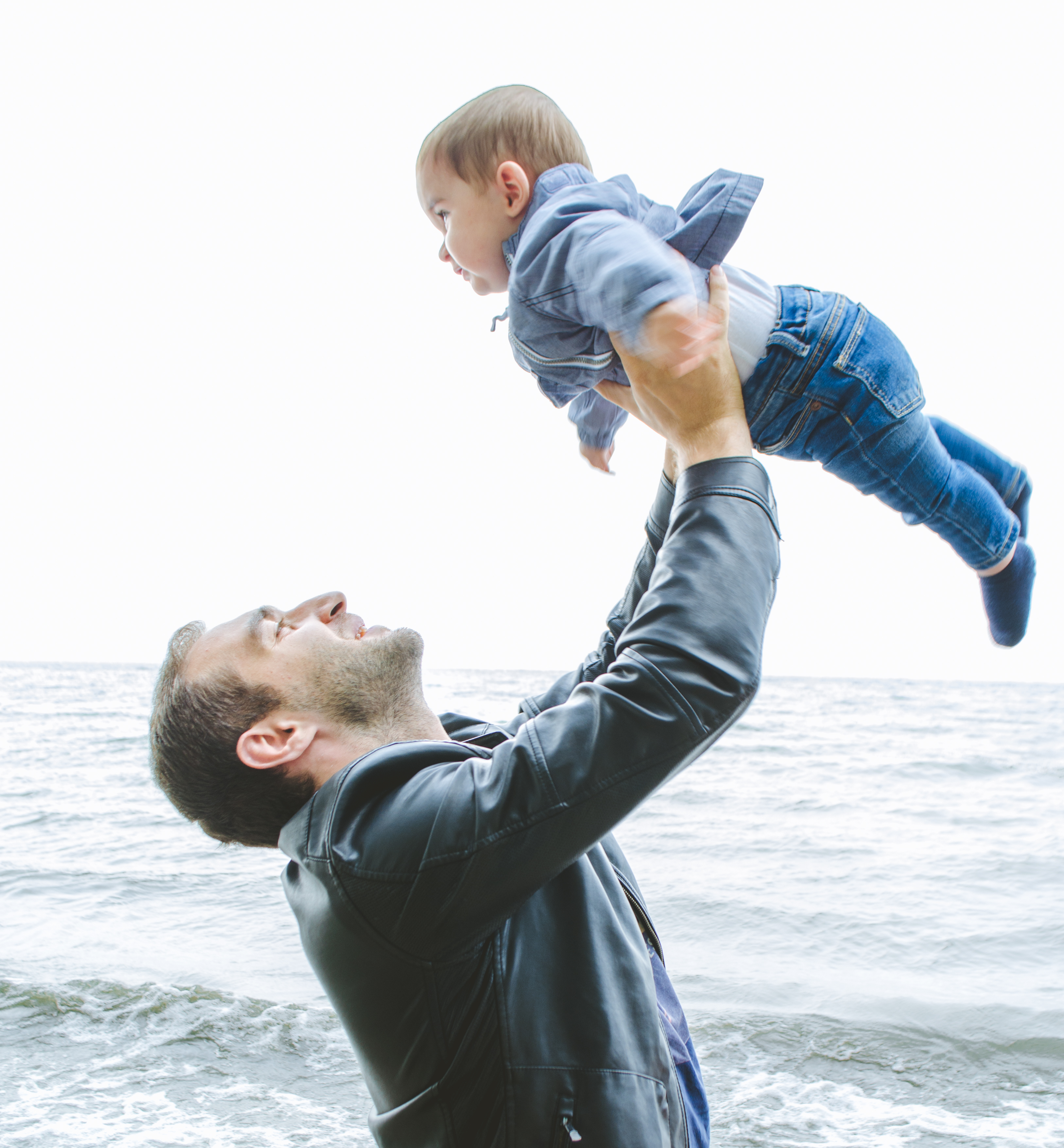
Father and child

A father, dad, or daddy, is the male parent of a child. Besides the paternal bonds of a father to his child or children, fathers may have a parental, legal, and social relationship with their child or children that carries with it certain rights and obligations.

A biological father is the male genetic contributor to the creation of the child, through sexual intercourse or sperm donation. A biological father may have legal obligations to a child not raised by him, such as an obligation of monetary support. A putative father is a man whose biological relationship to a child is alleged but has not been established.

A stepfather is a non-biological male parent married to a child's parent and forms a family unit but generally does not have the legal rights and responsibilities of a parent in relation to the child. An adoptive father is a man who has become the child's parent through the legal process of adoption.

The adjective "paternal" refers to a father and comparatively to "maternal" for a mother. The verb "to father" means to procreate or to sire a child from which also derives the noun "fathering". Biological fathers determine the sex of their child through a sperm cell which either contains an X chromosome (female), or Y chromosome (male). Related terms of endearment are dad (dada, daddy), baba, papa, pappa, papasita, (pa, pap) and pop. A male role model that children can look up to is sometimes referred to as a father-figure.

== Determination of fatherhood ==
Roman law defined fatherhood as "Mater semper certa; pater est quem nuptiae demonstrant" ("The [identity of the] mother is always certain; the father is whom the marriage vows indicate"). The biological father can be determined by DNA paternity testing. Non-biological children can be adopted according to the family law.

== Responsible and positive parenting ==
In today's world, the terms responsible parenting and positive parenting are often used.

UNICEF distinguishes the term positive parenting.

Positive parenting is parenting that creates an environment conducive to child development that prioritizes healthy parent-child relationships.

Responsible parenting is parenting that implies the fulfillment of the functions assigned to them by parents and is manifested in individual and social aspects, includes raising children, as well as taking into account the stage before the birth of a child, maintaining family relations with already adult children.

== Paternal rights ==
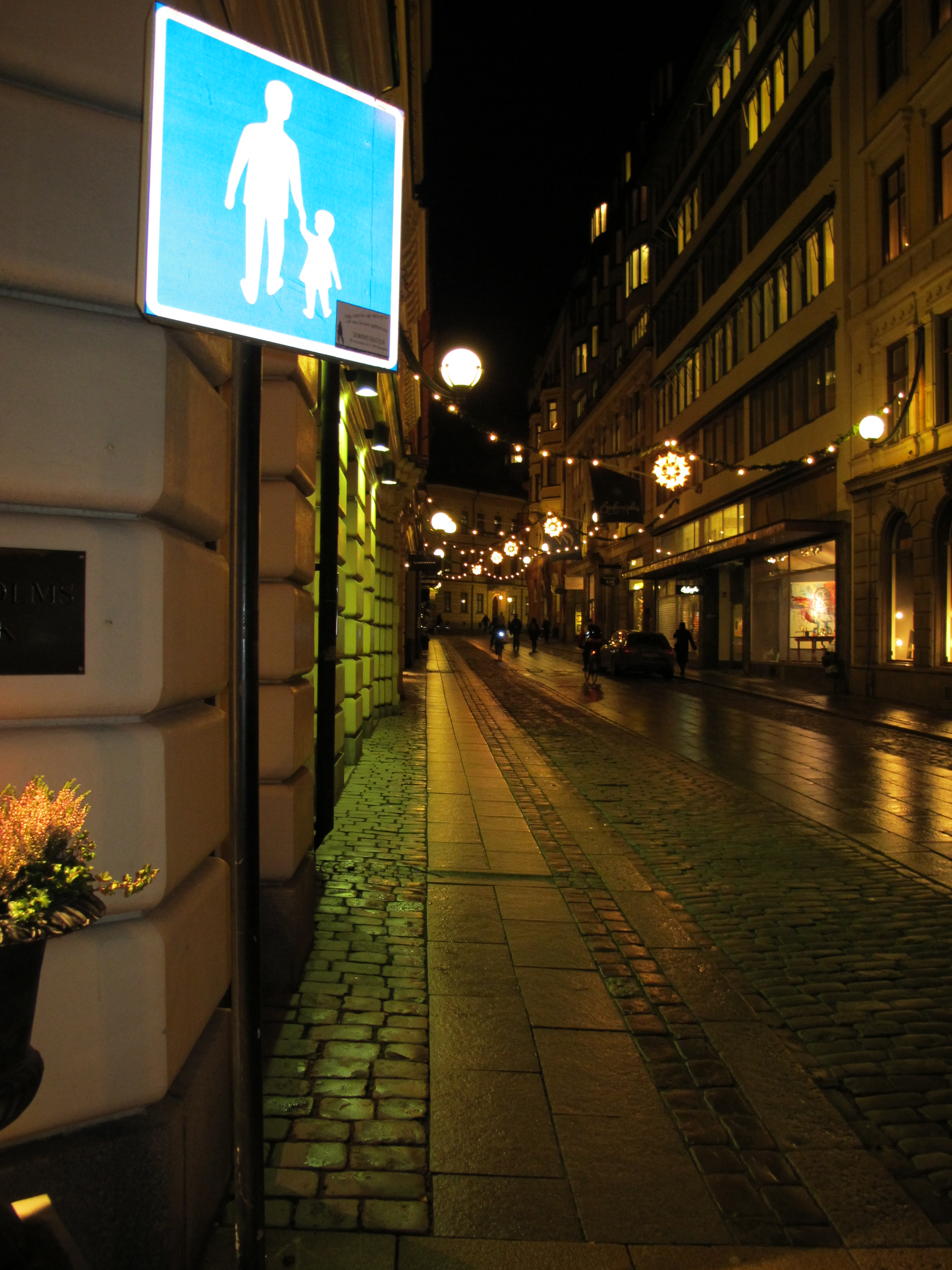
Stockholm pedestrian sign father and daughter

The paternity rights of a father with regard to his children differ widely from country to country, often reflecting the level of involvement and roles expected by that society.

Unlike motherhood, fatherhood is not mentioned in Universal Declaration of Human Rights.

Paternity leave

Parental leave is when a father takes time off to support his newly born or adopted baby. Paid paternity leave first began in Sweden in 1976, and is paid in more than half of European Union countries. In the case of male same-sex couples the law often makes no provision for either one or both fathers to take paternity leave.

Child custody

Fathers' rights movements, such as Fathers 4 Justice, argue that family courts are biased against fathers.

Child support

Child support is an ongoing periodic payment made by one parent to the other; it is normally paid by the parent who does not have custody.

Paternity fraud

An estimated 2% of British fathers experiences paternity fraud during a non-paternity event, bringing up a child they wrongly believe to be their biological offspring.

== Role of the father ==
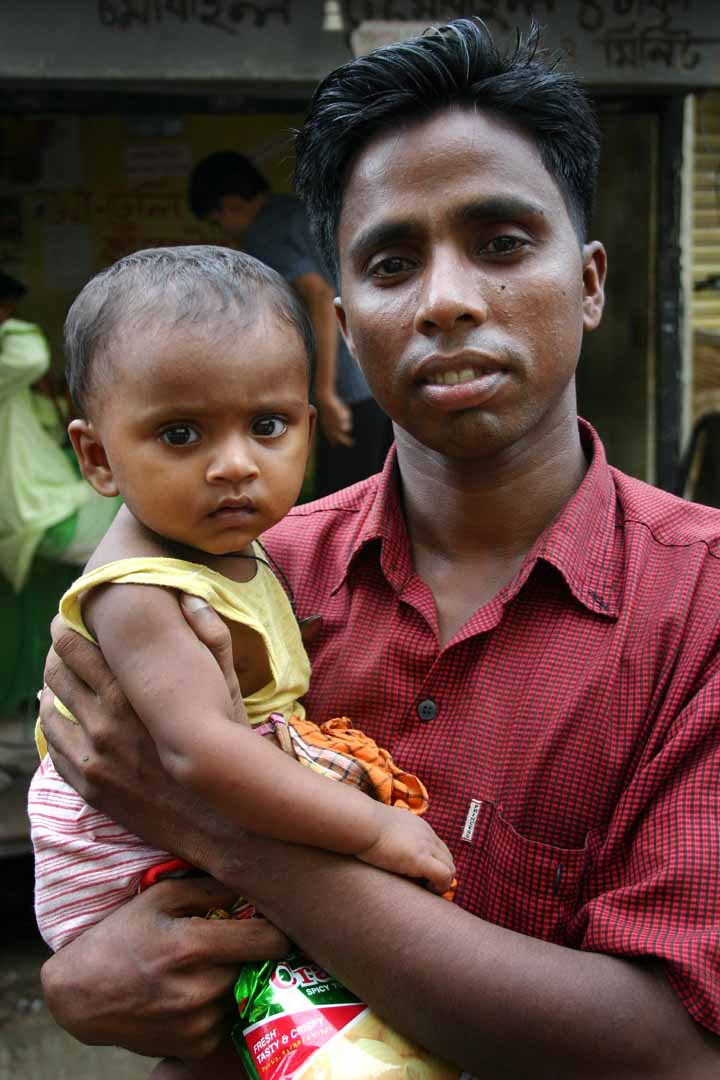
Father and child, Dhaka, Bangladesh

In almost all cultures, fathers are regarded as secondary caregivers. This perception is slowly changing with more and more fathers becoming primary caregivers while mothers go to work, or in single parenting situations and male same-sex parenting couples.

=== Fatherhood in the Western World ===
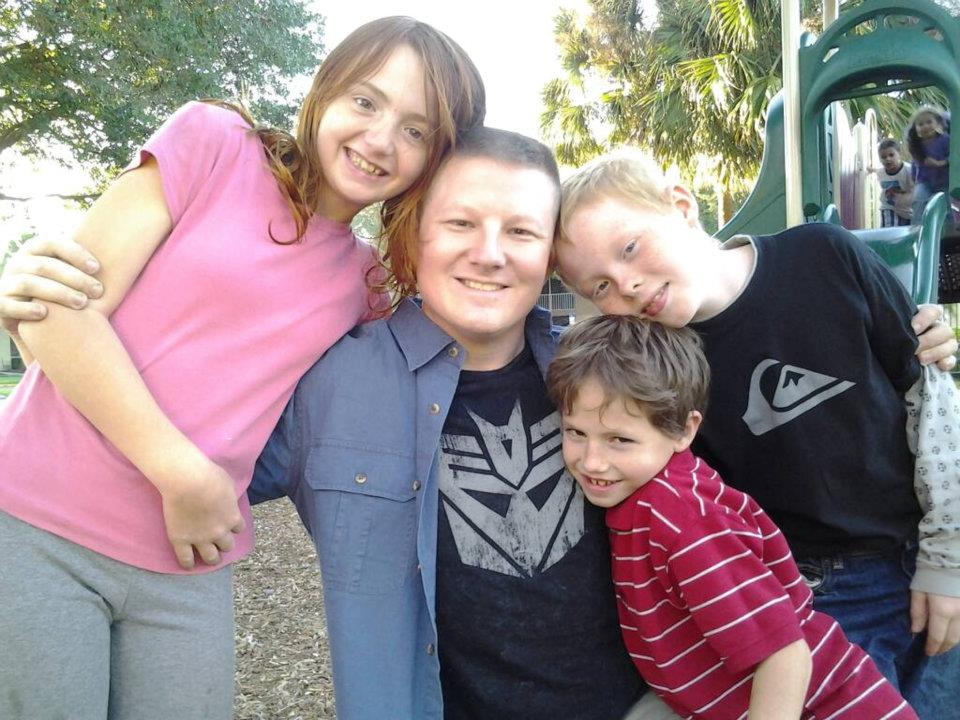
A father and his children in Florida

In the West, the image of the married father as the primary wage-earner is changing. The social context of fatherhood plays an important part in the well-being of men and their children. In the United States 16% of single parents were men as of 2013. A meta-analysis found fathers in the Western World tend to be biased in favor of daughters and against sons.

=== Importance of father or father-figure ===
Involved fathers offer developmentally specific provisions to their children and are impacted themselves by doing so. Active father figures may play a role in reducing behavior and psychological problems in young adults. An increased amount of father–child involvement may help increase a child's social stability, educational achievement, and their potential to have a solid marriage as an adult. Their children may also be more curious about the world around them and develop greater problem-solving skills. Children who were raised with fathers perceive themselves to be more cognitively and physically competent than their peers without a father. Mothers raising children together with a father reported less severe disputes with their child.

The father-figure is not always a child's biological father, and some children will have a biological father as well as a step- or nurturing father. When a child is conceived through sperm donation, the donor will be the "biological father" of the child.

Fatherhood as legitimate identity can be dependent on domestic factors and behaviors. For example, a study of the relationship between fathers, their sons, and home computers found that the construction of fatherhood and masculinity required that fathers display computer expertise.

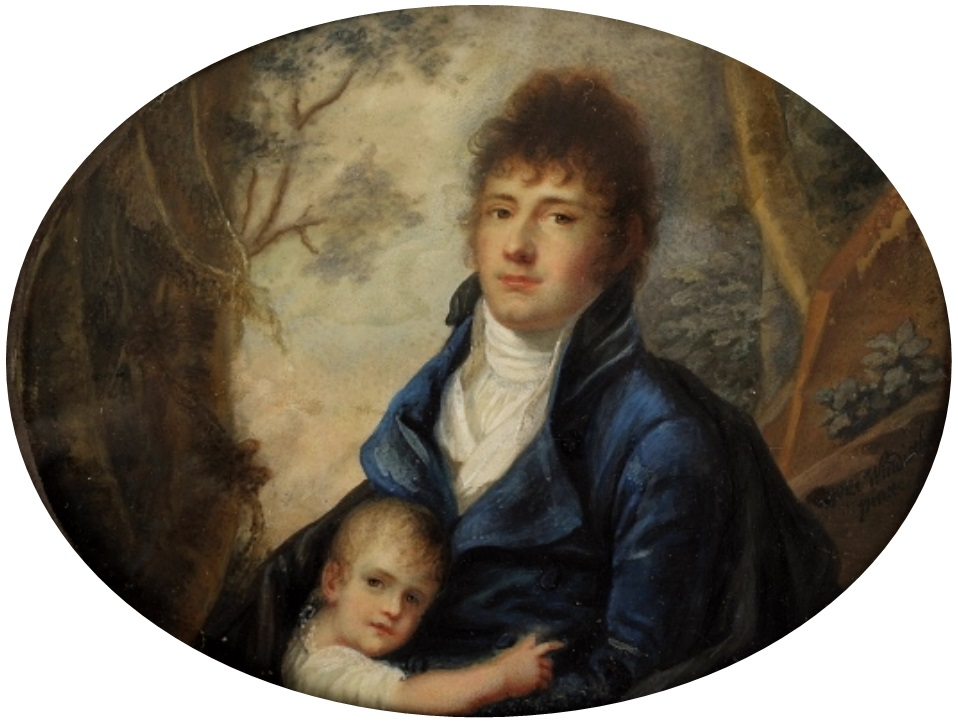
Paternal love (1803) by Nanette Rosenzweig, National Museum in Warsaw

== History of fatherhood ==
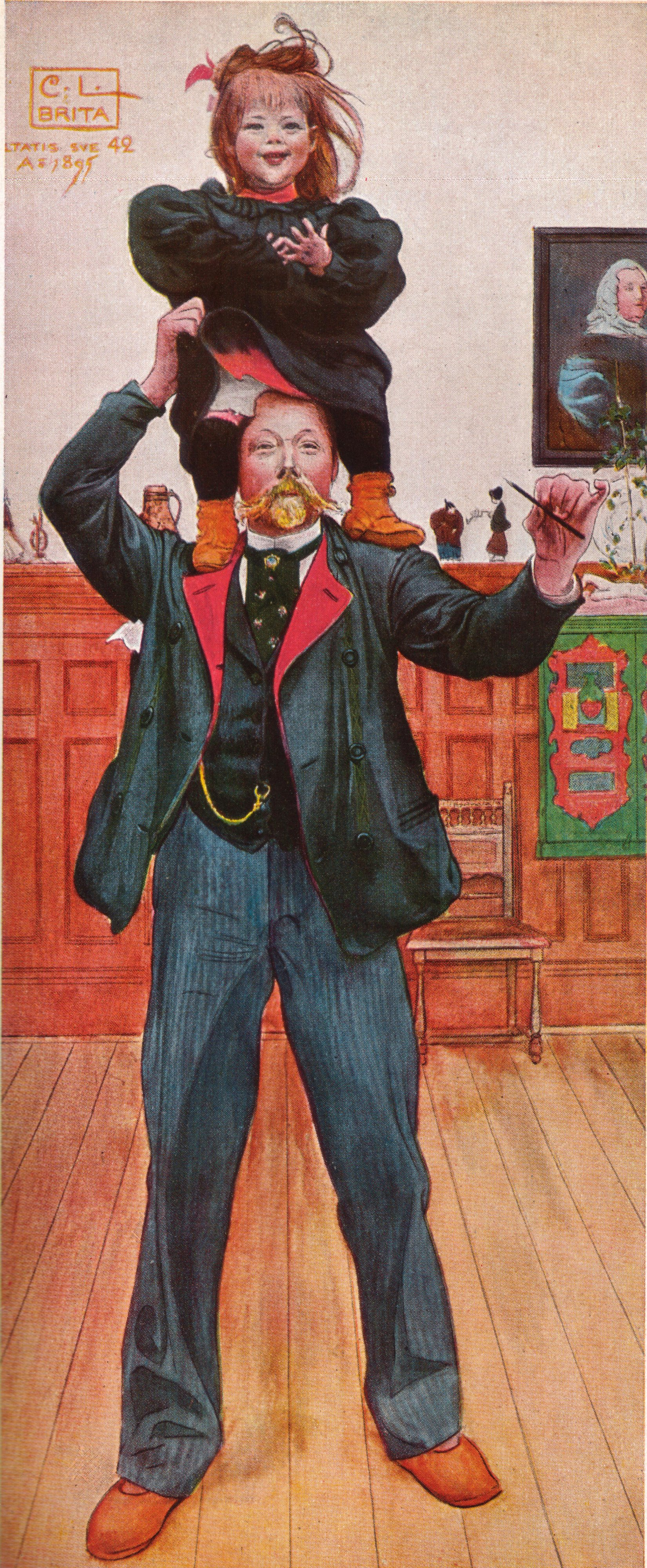
Painter Carl Larsson playing with his laughing daughter Brita

Many male animals do not participate in the rearing of their young. The development of human men as creatures which are involved in their offspring's upbringing took place during the stone age.

In medieval and most of modern European history, caring for children was predominantly the domain of mothers, whereas fathers in many societies provide for the family as a whole. Since the 1950s, social scientists and feminists have increasingly challenged gender roles in Western countries, including that of the male breadwinner. Policies are increasingly targeting fatherhood as a tool of changing gender relations. Research from various societies suggest that since the middle of the 20th century fathers have become increasingly involved in the care of their children.

== Patricide ==
In early human history there have been notable instances of patricide. For example:

- Tukulti-Ninurta I (r. 1243–1207 B.C.E.), Assyrian king, was killed by his own son after sacking Babylon.
- Sennacherib (r. 704–681 B.C.E.), Assyrian king, was killed by two of his sons for his desecration of Babylon.
- King Kassapa I (473 to 495 CE) creator of the Sigiriya citadel of ancient Sri Lanka killed his father king Dhatusena for the throne.
- Emperor Yang of Sui in Chinese history allegedly killed his father, Emperor Wen of Sui.
- Beatrice Cenci, Italian noblewoman who, according to legend, killed her father after he imprisoned and raped her. She was condemned and beheaded for the crime along with her brother and her stepmother in 1599.
- Lizzie Borden (1860–1927) allegedly killed her father and her stepmother with an axe in Fall River, Massachusetts, in 1892. She was acquitted, but her innocence is still disputed.
- Iyasus I of Ethiopia (1654–1706), one of the great warrior emperors of Ethiopia, was deposed by his son Tekle Haymanot in 1706 and subsequently assassinated.

In more contemporary history there have also been instances of father–offspring conflicts, such as:

- Chiyo Aizawa (born 1939) murdered her own father who had been raping her for fifteen years, on October 5, 1968, in Japan. The incident changed the Criminal Code of Japan regarding patricide.
- Kip Kinkel (born 1982), an Oregon boy who was convicted of killing his parents at home and two fellow students at school on May 20, 1998.
- Sarah Marie Johnson (born 1987), an Idaho girl who was convicted of killing both parents on the morning of September 2, 2003.
- Dipendra of Nepal (1971–2001) reportedly massacred much of his family at a royal dinner on June 1, 2001, including his father King Birendra, mother, brother, and sister.
- Christopher Porco (born 1983), was convicted on August 10, 2006, of the murder of his father and attempted murder of his mother with an axe.

== Terminology ==
=== Biological fathers ===
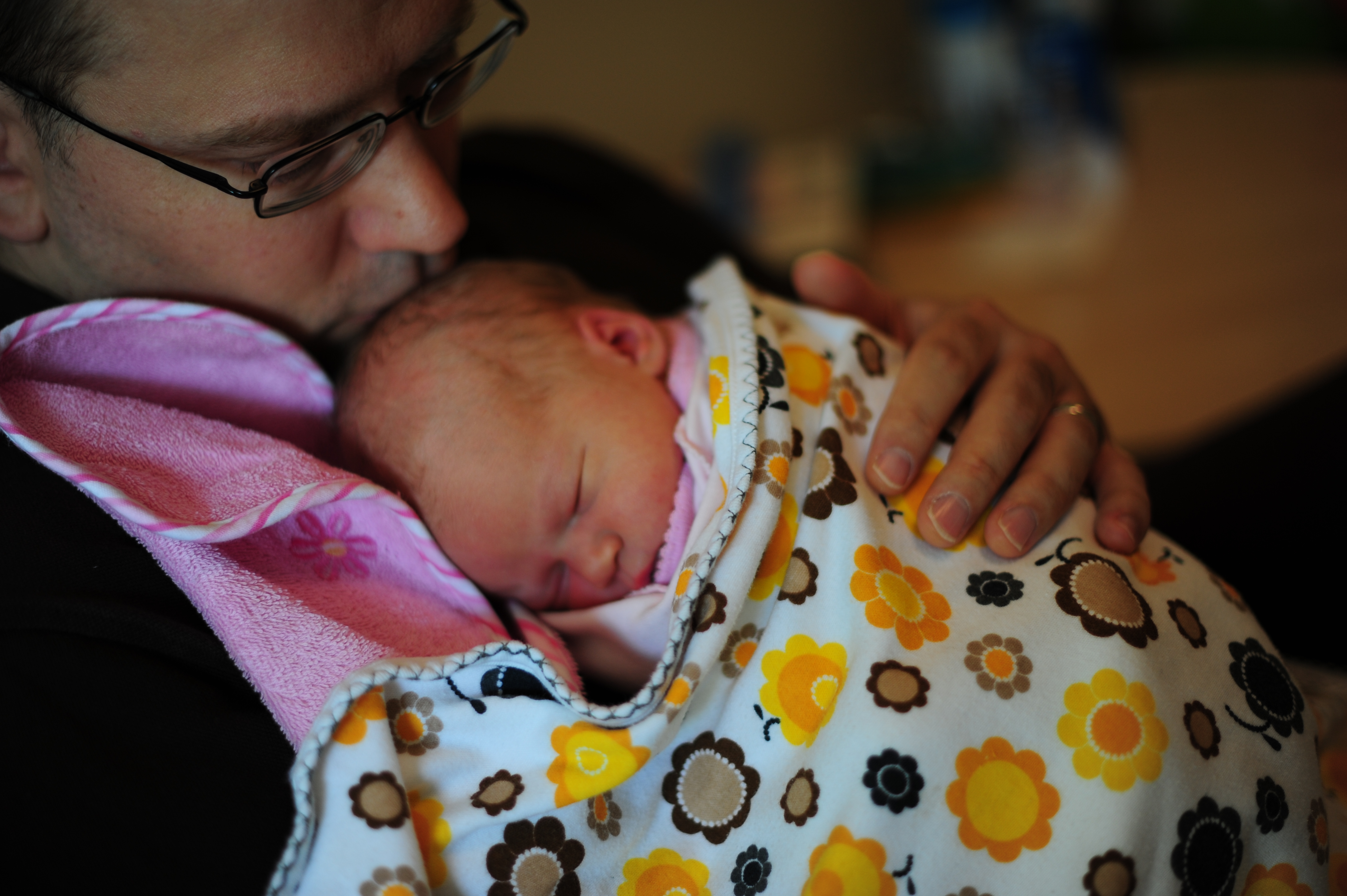
Paternal bonding between a father and his newborn daughter

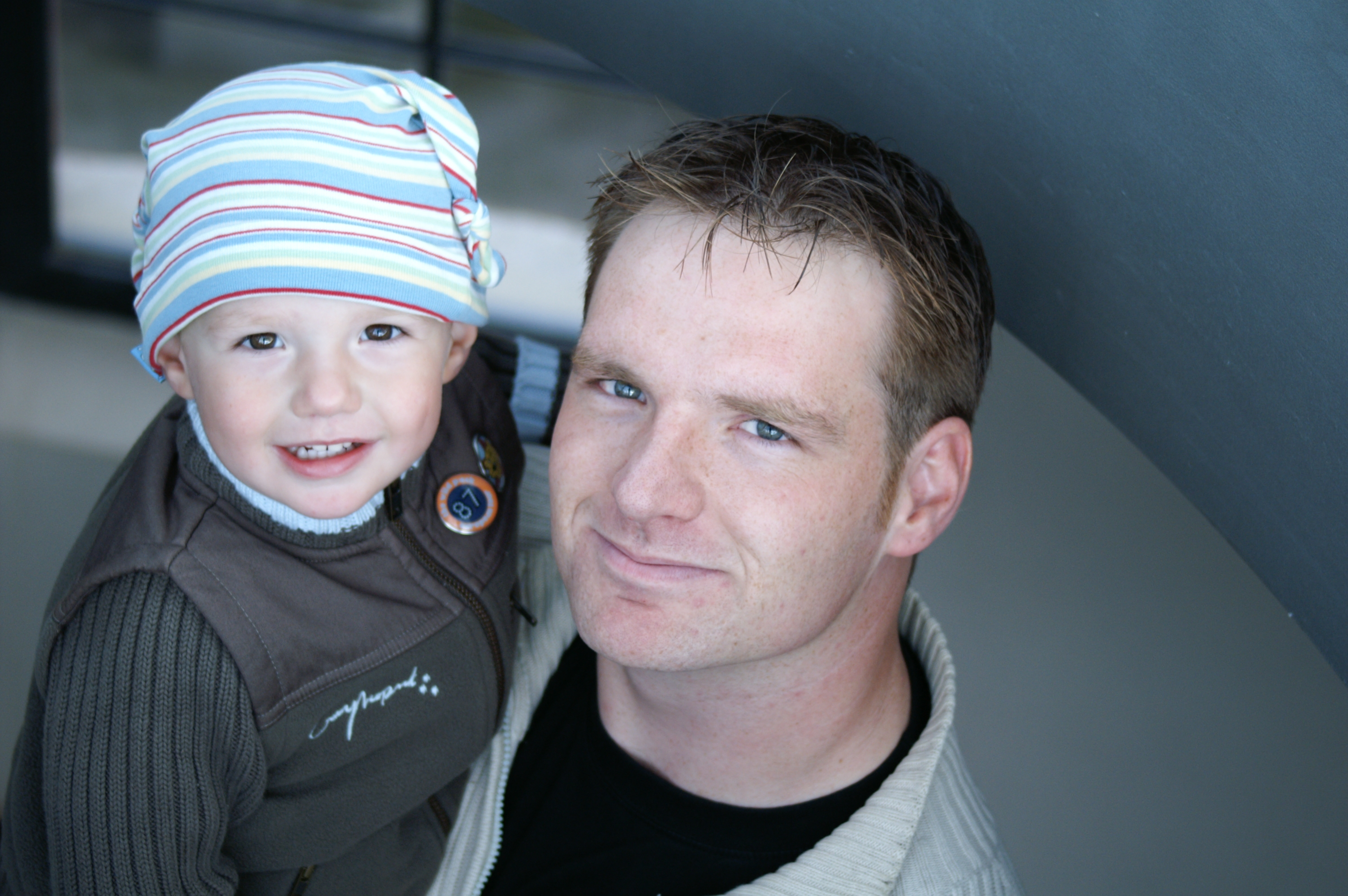
Father and son

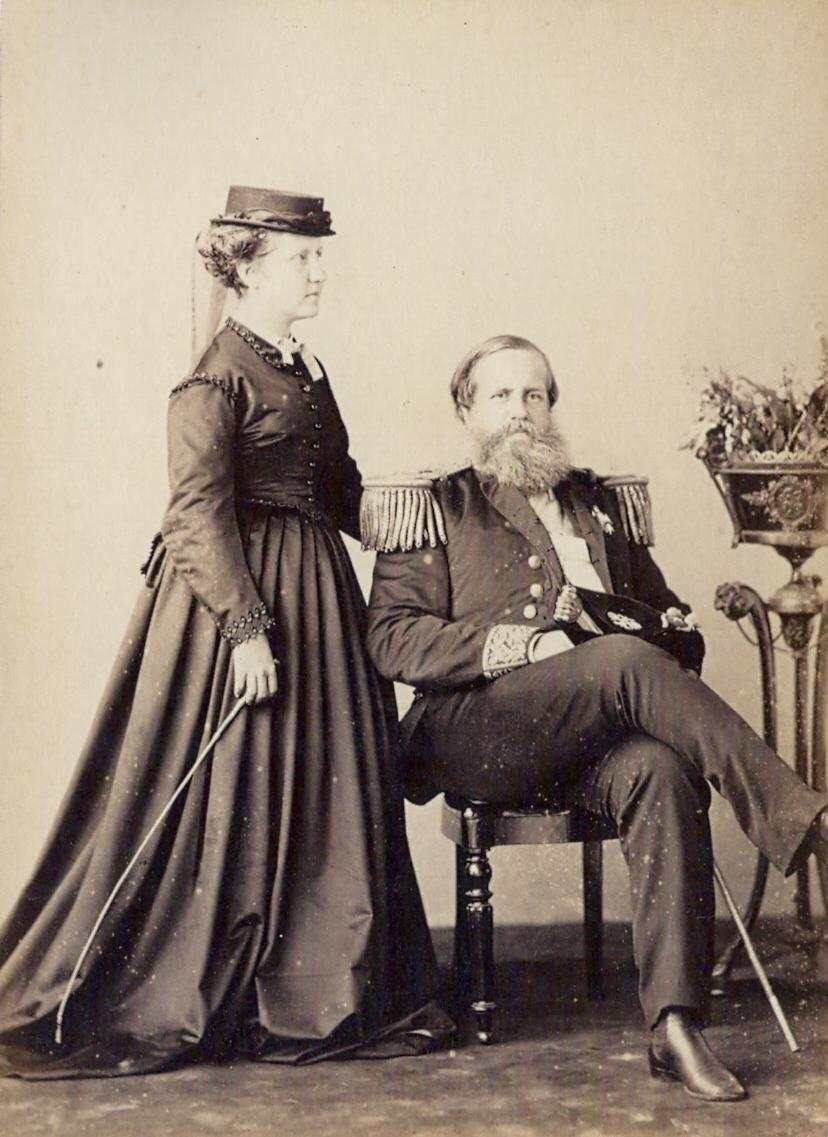
Emperor Pedro II of Brazil with his daughter and heir Isabel, Princess Imperial, c. 1870. Having acted as regent three times during her father's travels abroad, she became a pivotal figure in the final decades of the Empire of Brazil.

- Baby Daddy – a biological father who bears financial responsibility for a child, but with whom the mother has little or no contact.
- Birth father – the biological father of a child who, due to adoption or parental separation, does not raise the child or cannot take care of one.
- Biological father – or sometimes simply referred to as "Father" is the genetic father of a child.
- Posthumous father – father died before children were born (or even conceived in the case of artificial insemination).
- Putative father – unwed man whose legal relationship to a child has not been established but who is alleged to be or claims that he may be the biological father of a child.
- Sperm donor – an anonymous or known biological father who provides his sperm to be used in artificial insemination or in vitro fertilisation in order to father a child for a third-party female. Also used as a slang term meaning "baby daddy".
- Surprise father – where the men did not know that there was a child until possibly years afterward
- Teenage father/youthful father – father who is still a teenager.

=== Non-biological (social and legal relationship) ===
- Adoptive father – the father who has adopted a child
- Cuckolded father – where the child is the product of the mother's adulterous relationship
- DI Dad – social/legal father of children produced via Donor Insemination (where a donor's sperm were used to impregnate the DI Dad's partner)
- Father-in-law – the father of one's spouse
- Foster father – child is raised by a man who is not the biological or adoptive father
- Mother's partner – assumption that current partner fills father role
- Mother's husband – under some jurisdictions (e.g., in Quebec civil law), if the mother is married to another man, the latter will be defined as the father
- Presumed father – where a presumption of paternity has determined that a man is a child's father regardless of if he actually is or is not the biological father
- Social father – where a man takes de facto responsibility for a child, such as caring for one who has been abandoned or orphaned (the child is known as a "child of the family" in English law)
- Stepfather – a married non-biological father where the child is from a previous relationship

=== Fatherhood defined by contact level ===
- Absent father – father who cannot or will not spend time with his children
- Second father – a non-parent whose contact and support is robust enough that near parental bond occurs (often used for older male siblings who significantly aid in raising a child, sometimes for older men who took care of younger friends (only males) who have no families)
- Stay-at-home dad – the male equivalent of a housewife with child, where his spouse is breadwinner
- Weekend/holiday father – where children only stay with their father on weekends, holidays, etc.

== Non-human fatherhood ==
For some animals, it is the fathers who take care of the young.

- Darwin's frog (Rhinoderma darwini) fathers carry eggs in the vocal pouch.
- Most male waterfowl are very protective in raising their offspring, sharing scout duties with the female. Examples are the geese, swans, gulls, loons, and a few species of ducks. When the families of most of these waterfowl travel, they usually travel in a line and the fathers are usually the ones guarding the offspring at the end of the line while the mothers lead the way.
- The female seahorse (Hippocampus) deposits eggs into the pouch on the male's abdomen. The male releases sperm into the pouch, fertilizing the eggs. The embryos develop within the male's pouch, nourished by their individual yolk sacs.
- Male catfish keep their eggs in their mouth, foregoing eating until they hatch.
- Male emperor penguins alone incubate their eggs; females do no incubation. Rather than building a nest, each male protects his egg by balancing it on the tops of his feet, enclosed in a special brood pouch. Once the eggs are hatched, the females will rejoin the family.
- Male beavers secure their offspring along with the females during their first few hours of their lives. As the young beavers mature, their fathers will teach them how to search for materials to build and repair their own dams, before they disperse to find their own mates.
- Wolf fathers help feed, protect, and play with their pups. In some cases, several generations of wolves live in the pack, giving pups the care of grandparents, aunts/uncles, and siblings, in addition to parents. The father wolf is also the one who does most of the hunting when the females are securing their newborn pups.
- Coyotes are monogamous and male coyotes hunt and bring food to their young.
- Dolphin fathers help in the care of the young. Newborns are held on the surface of the water by both parents until they are ready to swim on their own.
- A number of bird species have active, caring fathers who assist the mothers, such as the waterfowls mentioned above.
- Apart from humans, fathers in few primate species care for their young. Those that do are tamarins and marmosets. Particularly strong care is also shown by siamangs where fathers carry infants after their second year. In titi and owl monkeys fathers carry their infants 90% of the time with "titi monkey infants developing a preference for their fathers over their mothers". Silverback gorillas have less role in the families but most of them serve as an extra protecting the families from harm and sometimes approaching enemies to distract them so that his family can escape unnoticed.

Many species, though, display little or no paternal role in caring for offspring. The male leaves the female soon after mating and long before any offspring are born. It is the females who must do all the work of caring for the young.

- A male bear leaves the female shortly after mating and will kill and sometimes eat any bear cub he comes across, even if the cub is his. Bear mothers spend much of their cubs' early life protecting them from males. (Many artistic works, such as advertisements and cartoons, depict kindly "papa bears" when this is the exact opposite of reality.)
- Domesticated dog fathers show little interest in their offspring, and unlike wolves, are not monogamous with their mates and are thus likely to leave them after mating.
- Male lions will tolerate cubs, but only allow them to eat meat from dead prey after they have had their fill. A few are quite cruel towards their young and may hurt or kill them with little provocation. A male who kills another male to take control of his pride will also usually kill any cubs belonging to that competing male. However, it is also the males who are responsible for guarding the pride while the females hunt. However, the male lions are the only felines that actually have a role in fatherhood.
- Male rabbits generally tolerate kits but unlike the females, they often show little interest in the kits and are known to play rough with their offspring when they are mature, especially towards their sons. This behaviour may also be part of an instinct to drive the young males away to prevent incest matings between the siblings. The females will eventually disperse from the warren as soon as they mature but the father does not drive them off like he normally does to the males.
- Horse stallions and pig boars have little to no role in parenting, nor are they monogamous with their mates. They will tolerate young to a certain extent, but due to their aggressive male nature, they are generally annoyed by the energetic exuberance of the young and may hurt or even kill the young. Thus, stud stallions and boars are not kept in the same pen as their young or other females.

Finally, in some species neither the father nor the mother provides any care. This is true for most insects, reptiles, and fish.

== See also ==
- Father complex
- Fathers' rights movement
- Father's Day
- God the Father
- Mother
- Nuclear family
- Paternal age effect
- Paternal bond
- Putative father
- Putative father registry
- Patriarch
- Patricide
- Parenting
- Responsible fatherhood
- Shared Earning/Shared Parenting Marriage
- Sociology of fatherhood
- Sky father
- Single parent
- "Father" can also refer metaphorically to a person who is considered the founder of a body of knowledge or of an institution. In such context the meaning of "father" is similar to that of "founder". See List of persons considered father or mother of a field.

== Bibliography ==
- Collier, Richard (2013). "Rethinking men and masculinities in the contemporary legal profession: the example of fatherhood, transnational business masculinities, and work-life balance in large law firms". Nevada Law Journal. 13 (2): 7.
- Diamond, Michael J. (2007). My father before me : how fathers and sons influence each other throughout their lives. New York: W.W. Norton. ISBN 9780393060607.
- Griswold, Robert L. Fatherhood in America: A History (1993) online
- Hawes, Joseph M. and Elizabeth Nybakken, eds. American Families : A Research Guide and Historical Handbook (Greenwood, 1981)
- Inhorn, Marcia C.; Chavkin, Wendy; Navarro, José-Alberto, eds. (2015). Globalized fatherhood. New York: Berghahn. ISBN 9781782384373. Studies by anthropologists, sociologists, and cultural geographers -
- Kraemer, Sebastian (1991). "The Origins of Fatherhood: An Ancient Family Process". Family Process. 30 (4): 377–392. doi:10.1111/j.1545-5300.1991.00377.x. PMID 1790784.
- LaRossa, Ralph. The modernization of fatherhood : a social and political history (1997) online
- LaRossa, Ralph. Of War and Men: World War II in the Lives of Fathers and their Families (U of Chicago Press, 2011)
- Marsiglio, William. Fatherhood: Contemporary Theory, Research, and Social Policy (Sage, 1996)
- Oechsle, Mechtild, et al. eds. Fatherhood in Late Modernity: Cultural Images, Social Practices, Structural Frames (2012)
- Strange, Julie-Marie. Fatherhood and the British Working Class, 1865-1914 (Cambridge UP. 2015)
- Tamis-LeMonda, Catherine S., and Natasha Cabrera, eds Handbook of Father Involvement: Multidisciplinary Perspectives (2002)
- Tosh, John. Manliness and masculinities in nineteenth-century Britain: essays on gender, family, and empire (2006)
- White, Aaronette M. Ain't I a Feminist?: African American Men Speak Out on Fatherhood, Friendship, Forgiveness, and Freedom (2008)
