= 48 Hours (TV program) =

American television show

- Genre: Documentary; Newsmagazine
- Created by: Howard Stringer
- Directed by: Matt DeVoe
- Presented by: Erin Moriarty; Peter Van Sant; Natalie Morales; Anne-Marie Green
- Composer: Julian Harris
- Country of origin: United States
- Original language: English
- No. of seasons: 39
- No. of episodes: 1,494

Production
- Executive producer: Judy Tygard
- Producers: Ryan N. Smith, Chuck Stevenson, Liza Finley, Paul La Rosa, Ruth Chenetz, Chris O'Connell, Chris Young Ritzen, Marcella Spencer, Lisa Freed, Stephanie Slifer, Richard Fetzer, Lauren A White
- Editors: Doreen Schecter, Greg McLaughlin, Phil Tangel, Marlon Disla, Richard Barber, Mike McHugh, Ken Blum, Diana Modica, Grayce Arlotta-Berner, David Spungen, Jud Johnston, Joan Adelman, Michelle Harris, Gary Winter, Marcus Balsam
- Camera setup: Multi-camera
- Running time: 42 minutes
- Production company: CBS News

Original release
- Network: CBS; Syndication (from September 11, 2023)
- Release: January 19, 1988 – present

Related
- 60 Minutes

48 Hours, known for a period of time as 48 Hours Investigates and 48 Hours Mystery, is an American documentary news magazine television show broadcast on CBS. The show has been broadcast on the network since January 19, 1988, in the United States. The show airs Saturdays at 10:00 p.m. Eastern and Pacific Time, as part of the network's placeholder Crimetime Saturday block; as such, it is currently one of only two remaining first-run prime time shows (excluding sports) airing Saturday nights on the major American broadcast television networks (along with Univision's Sabadazo). The show sometimes airs two-hour editions or two consecutive one-hour editions, depending on the subject involved or to serve as counterprogramming against other networks. Judy Tygard was named senior executive producer in January 2019, replacing Susan Zirinsky, who served as executive producer since 1996 until her early 2019 appointment as president of CBS News.

Reruns of 48 Hours are regularly broadcast on Investigation Discovery, the Oprah Winfrey Network and TLC as part of their daytime and/or weekend schedules, with varying titles based on the edition's subject matter (such as 48 Hours Hard Evidence, 48 Hours Investigates (a title that has also been used for the CBS broadcasts), 48 Hours on OWN or 48 Hours on ID).

== Format ==
=== Original format ===
The program was created by former CBS News president Howard Stringer. It drew its title, inspiration and original format from the CBS News documentary 48 Hours on Crack Street, which aired in September 1986, centering on the drug crisis plaguing a number of U.S. neighborhoods. Like the original documentary, the program originally focused on showing events occurring within a 48-hour time span; this format was eventually phased out by the early 1990s.

One of the contributors to that program, CBS News correspondent Harold Dow, had been a member of the 48 Hours on-air staff since its premiere. Dan Rather, at the time also serving as anchor of the CBS Evening News, was the primary host of 48 Hours for its first 14 years on the air. In 1997, CBS aired a special episode of 48 Hours titled Property of 48 Hours, which focused on some of the stories over the program's first nine years.

After low ratings on Saturday nights, the show was moved to Wednesday nights, replacing the comedies Lenny and Doctor Doctor, and it was soon to be moved to the 10:00 p.m. slot.

=== Current format ===
In the mid-2000s, the program transitioned into its current format, originally known as 48 Hours Mystery although it has since reverted to its original title, which mainly presents "true crime" documentaries.

In 2009, the program featured interviews with Jodi Arias concerning the murder of her former boyfriend, Travis Alexander. These recordings were later used in 2011 as evidence in court to convict Arias, the first time the program's interviews had ever been used in a death penalty trial.

On September 17, 2011, 48 Hours began broadcasting in high definition, making it the last prime time newsmagazine on American broadcast television to convert to the format.

== Variations ==
=== 48 Hours Investigates/Mystery ===
The program was revamped in 2002, when Lesley Stahl took over hosting duties from Dan Rather, and its title was changed to 48 Hours Investigates. The title was changed again to 48 Hours Mystery in 2004, and with its single-topic format, it does not use a single host but is narrated by the reporter assigned to the story. The current format of the documentary primarily deals with real-life mysteries and crime stories, again with just one mystery per episode (such as the murder of Brian Stidham), owing to its heritage structure of featuring a single topic per episode.

=== 48 Hours: Live to Tell ===
48 Hours: Live to Tell uses a different format from the earlier versions of the program. This format does not utilize a narrator; instead the stories are recounted entirely by the victims and those who know the victims of crimes; some episodes also focus on other life-threatening situations, but are recounted in the same manner.

=== 48 Hours: NCIS & NCIS: The Cases They Can't Forget ===
48 Hours: NCIS, also known as NCIS: The Cases They Can't Forget, utilizes a similar format to the standard, although it instead features real life cases from the Naval Criminal Investigative Service. Rocky Carroll, who plays NCIS director Leon Vance on NCIS, narrates these episodes, which aired on April 25, May 12, and May 23-June 13, 2017, all of which except for May 12 being on Tuesdays. As of 2018, it is in its second season.

On May 17, 2019, it was announced that the third season will premiere on May 29, 2019. For the third season, it was retitled NCIS: The Cases They Can't Forget.

== Broadcast history and Nielsen ratings ==
On occasions where CBS airs breaking news coverage in primetime, the time on air is reported to Nielsen as a special edition of 48 Hours so as to not affect the ratings of the preempted regular programming. This is akin to a legal fiction and has no relation to the actual show.

Season	Time slot (ET)	Rank	Rating
1987–88	Tuesday at 8:00-9:00	—N/a	
1988–89	Thursday at 8:00-9:00 (March 1988-September 1990)	—N/a	
1989–90	Thursday at 8:00-9:00 (March 1988-September 1990)	—N/a	
1990–91	Saturday at 10:00-11:00 (September 1990); Wednesday at 8:00-9:00 (October 1990-March 1991)	—N/a	
1991–92	Wednesday at 10:00-11:00 (April 1991-December 1994)	29	13.2
1992–93	Wednesday at 10:00-11:00 (April 1991-December 1994)	26	13.5 (Tied with Blossom)
1993–94	Wednesday at 10:00-11:00 (April 1991-December 1994)	—N/a	
1994–95	Thursday at 10:00-11:00 (January 1995-September 2000); Wednesday at 10:00-11:00 (July–September 1997); Tuesday at 10:00-11:00 (March–April 1998); Monday at 10:00-11:00 (June–September 1998); Monday at 10:00-11:00 (June–September 1999); Tuesday at 10:00-11:00 (July–September 1999); Monday at 10:00-11:00 (May–July 2000); Saturday at 8:00-9:00 (June 2000)	—N/a	
1995–96	Thursday at 10:00-11:00 (January 1995-September 2000); Wednesday at 10:00-11:00 (July–September 1997); Tuesday at 10:00-11:00 (March–April 1998); Monday at 10:00-11:00 (June–September 1998); Monday at 10:00-11:00 (June–September 1999); Tuesday at 10:00-11:00 (July–September 1999); Monday at 10:00-11:00 (May–July 2000); Saturday at 8:00-9:00 (June 2000)	—N/a	
1996–97	Thursday at 10:00-11:00 (January 1995-September 2000); Wednesday at 10:00-11:00 (July–September 1997); Tuesday at 10:00-11:00 (March–April 1998); Monday at 10:00-11:00 (June–September 1998); Monday at 10:00-11:00 (June–September 1999); Tuesday at 10:00-11:00 (July–September 1999); Monday at 10:00-11:00 (May–July 2000); Saturday at 8:00-9:00 (June 2000)	—N/a	
1997–98	Thursday at 10:00-11:00 (January 1995-September 2000); Wednesday at 10:00-11:00 (July–September 1997); Tuesday at 10:00-11:00 (March–April 1998); Monday at 10:00-11:00 (June–September 1998); Monday at 10:00-11:00 (June–September 1999); Tuesday at 10:00-11:00 (July–September 1999); Monday at 10:00-11:00 (May–July 2000); Saturday at 8:00-9:00 (June 2000)	—N/a	
1998–99	Thursday at 10:00-11:00 (January 1995-September 2000); Wednesday at 10:00-11:00 (July–September 1997); Tuesday at 10:00-11:00 (March–April 1998); Monday at 10:00-11:00 (June–September 1998); Monday at 10:00-11:00 (June–September 1999); Tuesday at 10:00-11:00 (July–September 1999); Monday at 10:00-11:00 (May–July 2000); Saturday at 8:00-9:00 (June 2000)	—N/a	
1999–2000	Thursday at 10:00-11:00 (January 1995-September 2000); Wednesday at 10:00-11:00 (July–September 1997); Tuesday at 10:00-11:00 (March–April 1998); Monday at 10:00-11:00 (June–September 1998); Monday at 10:00-11:00 (June–September 1999); Tuesday at 10:00-11:00 (July–September 1999); Monday at 10:00-11:00 (May–July 2000); Saturday at 8:00-9:00 (June 2000)	—N/a	
2000–01	Thursday at 8:00-9:00 (October–December 2000); Thursday at 10:00-11:00 (December 2000-February 2001); Thursday at 10:00-11:00 (May–August 2001); Monday at 10:00-11:00 (May–July 2001)	—N/a	
2001–02	Friday at 10:00-11:00 (July 2001-June 2002); Thursday at 8:00-9:00 (August–September 2001); Wednesday at 10:00-11:00 (March–May 2002); Monday at 10:00-11:00 (April–August 2002)	—N/a	
2002–03	Friday at 8:00-9:00 (June 2002-January 2003); Wednesday at 10:00-11:00 (July–September 2002); Friday at 10:00-11:00 (August–September 2002); Wednesday at 10:00-11:00 (January–June 2003); Friday at 10:00-11:00 (February–August 2003); Saturday at 8:00-9:00 (July–August 2003); Wednesday at 10:00-11:00 (August–September 2003)	—N/a	
2003–04	Saturday at 8:00-9:00 (September–November 2003); Wednesday at 10:00-11:00 (October 2003-September 2004); Friday at 10:00-11:00 (February–March 2004); Friday at 10:00-11:00 (May–September 2004)	—N/a	
2004–05	Saturday at 10:00-11:00; Tuesday at 10:00-11:00 (May–July 2005); Tuesday at 10:00-11:00 (June–August 2006); Wednesday at 10:00-11:00 (August–September 2021)	—N/a	
2005–06	Saturday at 10:00-11:00; Tuesday at 10:00-11:00 (May–July 2005); Tuesday at 10:00-11:00 (June–August 2006); Wednesday at 10:00-11:00 (August–September 2021)	—N/a	
2006–07	Saturday at 10:00-11:00; Tuesday at 10:00-11:00 (May–July 2005); Tuesday at 10:00-11:00 (June–August 2006); Wednesday at 10:00-11:00 (August–September 2021)	—N/a	
2007–08	Saturday at 10:00-11:00; Tuesday at 10:00-11:00 (May–July 2005); Tuesday at 10:00-11:00 (June–August 2006); Wednesday at 10:00-11:00 (August–September 2021)	—N/a	
2008–09	Saturday at 10:00-11:00; Tuesday at 10:00-11:00 (May–July 2005); Tuesday at 10:00-11:00 (June–August 2006); Wednesday at 10:00-11:00 (August–September 2021)	—N/a	
2009–10	Saturday at 10:00-11:00; Tuesday at 10:00-11:00 (May–July 2005); Tuesday at 10:00-11:00 (June–August 2006); Wednesday at 10:00-11:00 (August–September 2021)	—N/a	
2010–11	Saturday at 10:00-11:00; Tuesday at 10:00-11:00 (May–July 2005); Tuesday at 10:00-11:00 (June–August 2006); Wednesday at 10:00-11:00 (August–September 2021)	—N/a	
2011–12	Saturday at 10:00-11:00; Tuesday at 10:00-11:00 (May–July 2005); Tuesday at 10:00-11:00 (June–August 2006); Wednesday at 10:00-11:00 (August–September 2021)	—N/a	
2012–13	Saturday at 10:00-11:00; Tuesday at 10:00-11:00 (May–July 2005); Tuesday at 10:00-11:00 (June–August 2006); Wednesday at 10:00-11:00 (August–September 2021)	—N/a	
2013–14	Saturday at 10:00-11:00; Tuesday at 10:00-11:00 (May–July 2005); Tuesday at 10:00-11:00 (June–August 2006); Wednesday at 10:00-11:00 (August–September 2021)	—N/a	
2014–15	Saturday at 10:00-11:00; Tuesday at 10:00-11:00 (May–July 2005); Tuesday at 10:00-11:00 (June–August 2006); Wednesday at 10:00-11:00 (August–September 2021)	—N/a	
2015–16	Saturday at 10:00-11:00; Tuesday at 10:00-11:00 (May–July 2005); Tuesday at 10:00-11:00 (June–August 2006); Wednesday at 10:00-11:00 (August–September 2021)	—N/a	
2016–17	Saturday at 10:00-11:00; Tuesday at 10:00-11:00 (May–July 2005); Tuesday at 10:00-11:00 (June–August 2006); Wednesday at 10:00-11:00 (August–September 2021)	—N/a	
2017–18	Saturday at 10:00-11:00; Tuesday at 10:00-11:00 (May–July 2005); Tuesday at 10:00-11:00 (June–August 2006); Wednesday at 10:00-11:00 (August–September 2021)	—N/a	
2018–19	Saturday at 10:00-11:00; Tuesday at 10:00-11:00 (May–July 2005); Tuesday at 10:00-11:00 (June–August 2006); Wednesday at 10:00-11:00 (August–September 2021)	TBA	
2019–20	Saturday at 10:00-11:00; Tuesday at 10:00-11:00 (May–July 2005); Tuesday at 10:00-11:00 (June–August 2006); Wednesday at 10:00-11:00 (August–September 2021)	TBA	
2020–21	Saturday at 10:00-11:00; Tuesday at 10:00-11:00 (May–July 2005); Tuesday at 10:00-11:00 (June–August 2006); Wednesday at 10:00-11:00 (August–September 2021)	TBA	
2021–22	Saturday at 10:00-11:00; Tuesday at 10:00-11:00 (May–July 2005); Tuesday at 10:00-11:00 (June–August 2006); Wednesday at 10:00-11:00 (August–September 2021)		
2022–23	Saturday at 10:00-11:00; Tuesday at 10:00-11:00 (May–July 2005); Tuesday at 10:00-11:00 (June–August 2006); Wednesday at 10:00-11:00 (August–September 2021)		
2023–24	Saturday at 10:00-11:00; Tuesday at 10:00-11:00 (May–July 2005); Tuesday at 10:00-11:00 (June–August 2006); Wednesday at 10:00-11:00 (August–September 2021)		

== International release ==
The series has also aired on various channels in Canada, most recently Global. Since June 2015, it has also aired in Australia on Network 10 (a sister network of CBS since 2017).

== Awards and nominations ==
The program has received over 20 Emmy Awards, two Peabody Awards (one in 2000 for the report "Heroes Under Fire" and one for the reports "Abortion Battle" and "On Runaway Street"), and an Ohio State Award.

== See also ==
- 20/20 (American TV program)
- Dateline NBC
