= Murders of Diane and Alan Scott Johnson =

2003 double murder in the United States

- Location: Bellevue, Idaho, U.S.
- Date: September 2, 2003; 23 years ago
- Attack type: Double homicide, parricide
- Victims: Alan Scott Johnson; Diane Johnson
- Perpetrator: Sarah Marie Johnson
- Motive: Parents' prohibition of Sarah dating a 19-year-old drug dealer

The murders of Diane and Alan Scott Johnson occurred on September 2, 2003. They were shot to death in their Bellevue, Idaho, home by their 16-year-old daughter, Sarah Marie Johnson.

== Perpetrator ==
Sarah Marie Johnson was born January 24, 1987. She grew up in the Idaho city of Bellevue, and attended Wood River High School in Hailey.

== History ==
On September 2, 2003, Alan Scott Johnson and Diane Johnson were shot to death in their Bellevue home. Alan was shot twice in the chest, while Diane was shot in the head. Their daughter, Sarah Johnson, was found guilty of their murder. Sarah was 16 years old at the time. Her apparent motive was her parents' prohibiting her from dating a 19-year-old Mexican immigrant drug dealer named Bruno Santos.

At approximately 6:20 a.m. that morning, Johnson took the murder weapon, a .264-caliber Winchester Model 70 bolt-action rifle from the guest house. The tenant of the house, Mel Speegle, had left for Boise, Idaho, and had not planned on returning for a week or so. She then walked into her parents' bedroom and shot her sleeping mother in the head, whereupon she walked into the bathroom and shot her father in the chest, right above the heart, while he was showering. DNA evidence was presented at trial from a discarded bathrobe and a latex glove that police found in the garbage can in front of the house. It contained the DNA of both victims and Sarah. Along with the robe and latex glove was a leather glove that had gunshot residue on it. In Johnson's bedroom, investigators located the other leather glove that belonged to the pair.

Johnson was convicted of the murders of her parents by an Ada County, Idaho, jury on March 16, 2005. She was sentenced to two concurrent life without parole terms plus fifteen years for a firearm enhancement. The Idaho Supreme Court upheld her conviction in 2008.

In 2012, Johnson's lawyer filed a petition for a new trial, charging that she had ineffective legal counsel in the murder trial. They also cited the absence of any blood spatter on Johnson and the fact that fingerprints on the murder weapon matched those of a renter who was living in the family's guesthouse. In October 2014, the request was denied. In 2017, Sarah tried to get her life sentence reduced, citing the Miller v. Alabama and Montgomery v. Louisiana Supreme Court rulings; however, her sentence was upheld.

== Media ==
The case has been featured in a number of films, television shows and other works:

=== Film and television ===
- Solved (Investigation Discovery)
- Suburban Secrets (TruTV)
- Murder (Spike TV)
- Snapped (Oxygen)
- Deadly Women (Investigation Discovery; episode "Lethal Vengeance")
- Primetime: Crime (ABC) – edited into an episode of Investigation Discovery's 20/20 on ID in 2014
- Forensic Files (TruTV)
- Too Young to Kill: 15 Shocking Crimes (E!)
- Killer Women (Netflix)
- Corrupt Crimes (Syndication)
- Hombres Asesinos

(Historias entretenidas; Temporada 4 Episodio 6 "Edwin")

=== Other ===
- Small Town Murder Ep. 67 (podcast)
- Let's Go to Court Ep. 210 (podcast)
- Sword and Scale PLUS Ep. 114 (podcast)
- Crimelines, episode "Diane and Alan Johnson: Early Suspects" (podcast)

== See also ==
- Parricide
