= Responsible fatherhood =

Father-involvement movement

The responsible fatherhood movement encourages fathers to be involved in their children's lives and advocates for societal support of such involvement.

== In the United States ==
Along with changes in family formation in the latter part of the 20th century, the issue of healthy, responsible fatherhood also began to gain attention. In 1974, Dr. James A. Levine published Who Will Raise the Children? New Options for Fathers (and Mothers). In this report, "Levine suggested that the long-term goal of equal opportunity for women in American society would never be achieved without serious and meaningful recognition of the significance, interest, and responsibility of fathers in children's lives. Levine called for changes in major social institutions, changes in how families raise boys and girls, and changes in the mutual expectations of men and women as they form families."

Throughout the 1980s and 1990s, a national responsible fatherhood movement began to take form in the United States. "Within this 'movement,' one may discern a range of groups with competing masculinities and contesting claims and grievances....[T]he Fatherhood Responsibility Movement seeks to overcome barriers of income, race and politics."

As the responsible fatherhood movement has matured, educational and social service programs have grown to meet the needs of fathers across the country. For example, in 1981, the Ford Foundation infused the first large-scale U.S. funding for responsible fatherhood programming through The Fatherhood Project, initially at Bank Street College of Education in New York and expanding across the nation at various other sites. In 1985, the National Urban League began its Male Responsibility Project, focusing on fatherhood among teen parents. By 1988 the U.S. federal Family Support Act included a provision that allowed states to use Welfare-to-Work funds, intended to help single mothers on welfare, to increase contact between noncustodial fathers and their children. In 1991, the nation's first fathers' resource center was launched in Minneapolis, Minnesota. The number of services and supports for fathers continues to expand.

In the first years of the 21st century, there was a growing awareness about the importance of healthy father-child relationships. "Among these benefits are higher levels of school performance and increases in healthy behaviors... For example, children raised with significant positive father involvement display greater empathy, higher self-esteem, increased curiosity, higher verbal skills, and higher scores of cognitive competence." Increasingly, the responsible fatherhood movement has defined itself by focusing on the development of healthy father-child relationships. A separate branch of the men's movement has been that related to Fathers' rights movement. In contrast, the responsible fatherhood movement embraces healthy motherhood and seeks to encourage stronger supports for mothers and fathers to grow as healthy parents.

Responsible fatherhood in the United States is traditionally defined by financial provision, declaring legal paternity, and active participating in caregiving tasks Recent research suggests that low-income fathers may define responsible fatherhood with a different set of criteria that places more emphasis on time, play, and keeping an eye on the child's well-being, similar to a Big Brother or a social worker.

== See also ==
- Father figure
- Shared earning/shared parenting marriage
- Social father
