= Rough-and-tumble play =

Form of play fighting

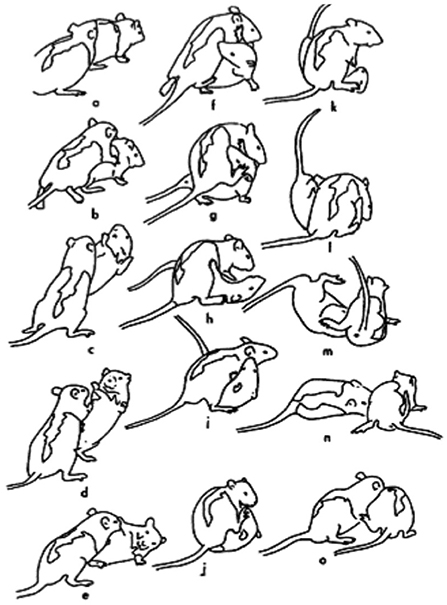
Components of playfighting as seen in juvenile rats.

Rough-and-tumble play, also called play fighting, is a form of play where participants compete with one another attempting to obtain certain advantages (such as biting or pushing the opponent onto the ground) but play in this way without the severity of genuine fighting (which rough-and-tumble play resembles). Rough-and-tumble play is one of the most common forms of play in both humans and non-human animals.

It has been pointed out that despite its apparent aggressiveness, rough-and-tumble play is helpful for encouraging cooperative behavior and cultivation of social skills. For rough-and-tumble play to remain "play" (instead of spiraling into a real fight), there has to be cooperation (e.g., with participants agreeing to not actually exert forces in pretend punches). Sometimes, one participant may push or hit harder than expected, and then the other participants will have to decide whether it was an unintended mistake or a malicious transgression. Thus, rough-and-tumble play involves considerable social reasoning and judgment.

== Sexual dimorphism ==
This form of play exhibits notable sexual dimorphism in many mammalian species, including humans. Males typically engage in this type of play more frequently and intensively than females, a pattern observed across diverse taxa ranging from rodents to primates. This dimorphism is thought to result from the influence of prenatal and early postnatal hormones, particularly androgens like testosterone, which shape the neural circuits governing social and play behavior. Researchers propose that these sex differences may have evolutionary significance, contributing to the development of motor skills, dominance behaviors, and social strategies that were advantageous for reproductive success in ancestral environments.

== Mammals ==
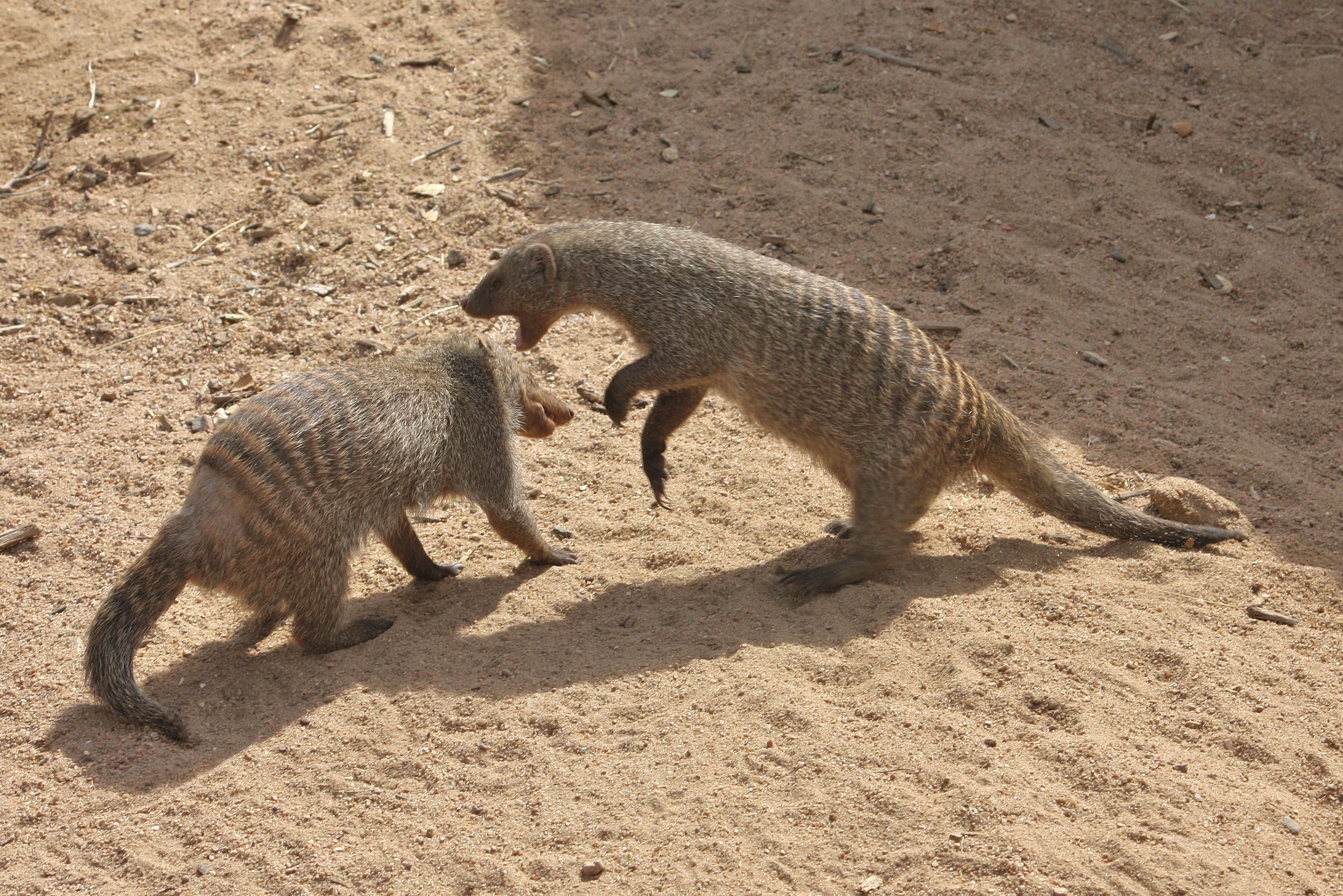
Banded mongooses (Mungos mungo), play fighting. Denver Zoo, Denver, Colorado.

=== Carnivora ===
Male carnivores tend to have higher rates of rough-and-tumble play compared to females. This is potentially due to the fact that males are typically larger, due to polygamous or promiscuous mating systems, as well as energy requirements imposed on females by feeding young.

Conflicting results have arisen from Pinnipeds. Some studies report that male and female pups do not show significant differences in engagement in rough-and-tumble play, while others suggest that male pups spend more time engaged in dyadic play bouts. Male Galapagos fur seal pups (Arctocephalus galapagoensis) are reported to engage in play bouts that are twice as long as those seen in female conspecifics. Rough-and-tumble play has also been observed in South American fur seals (Arctocephalus australis) and harbour seals (Phoca vitulina).

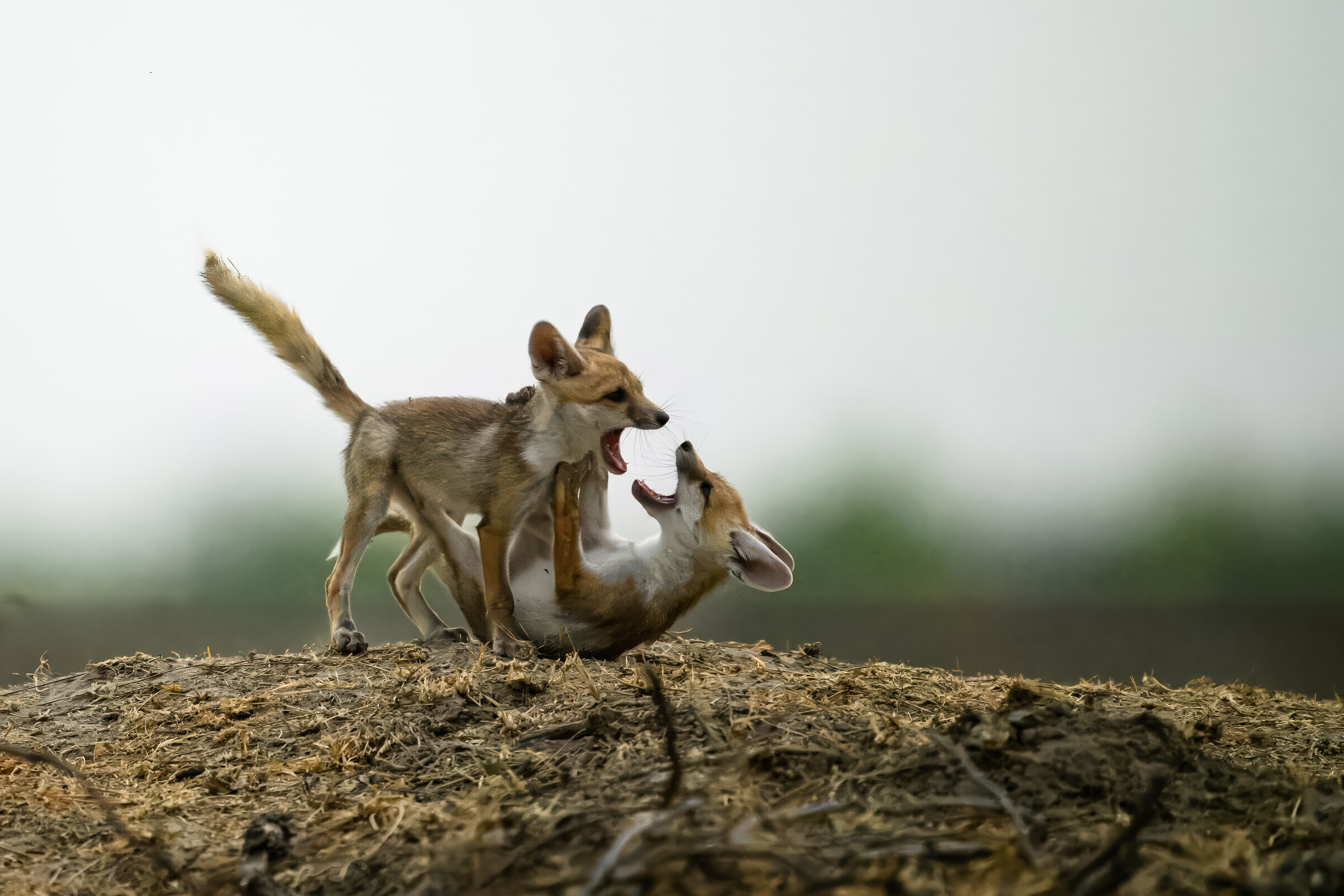
Two Desert Fox cubs playing with each other. Little Ran of Kutch, Dasada, Gujrat, India.

Rough-and-tumble play has been reported in the following canine species: domestic dogs (Canis familiaris), coyotes (Canis latrans), wolves (Canis lupus occidentalis), bush dogs (Speothos venaticus), crab-eating foxes (Cerdocyon thous), and maned wolves (Chrysocyon brachyurus). In domestic puppies, males initiate more often than females and will initiate more often in mixed-sex dyads. No sexed differences have been reported in wolves, bush dogs, crab-eating foxes or maned wolves.

In Felidae, rough-and-tumble play has been reported in the Eurasian lynx (Lynx lynx), Far-Eastern wild cat (Prionailurus bengalensis euptilura), and domestic cat (Felis catus), though no known sexed differences occur between male and female kittens. Meerkats (Suricata suricatta) also show no sexual dimorphism in play frequencies or initiations.

=== Primates ===
Primates are known for their relatively long juvenile development periods, which are often associated with juvenile play. Long juvenile periods, small litter sizes, long intervals between births, extended lifespans and high investment in offsprings mean that primates are often an ideal model for looking at play behaviour.

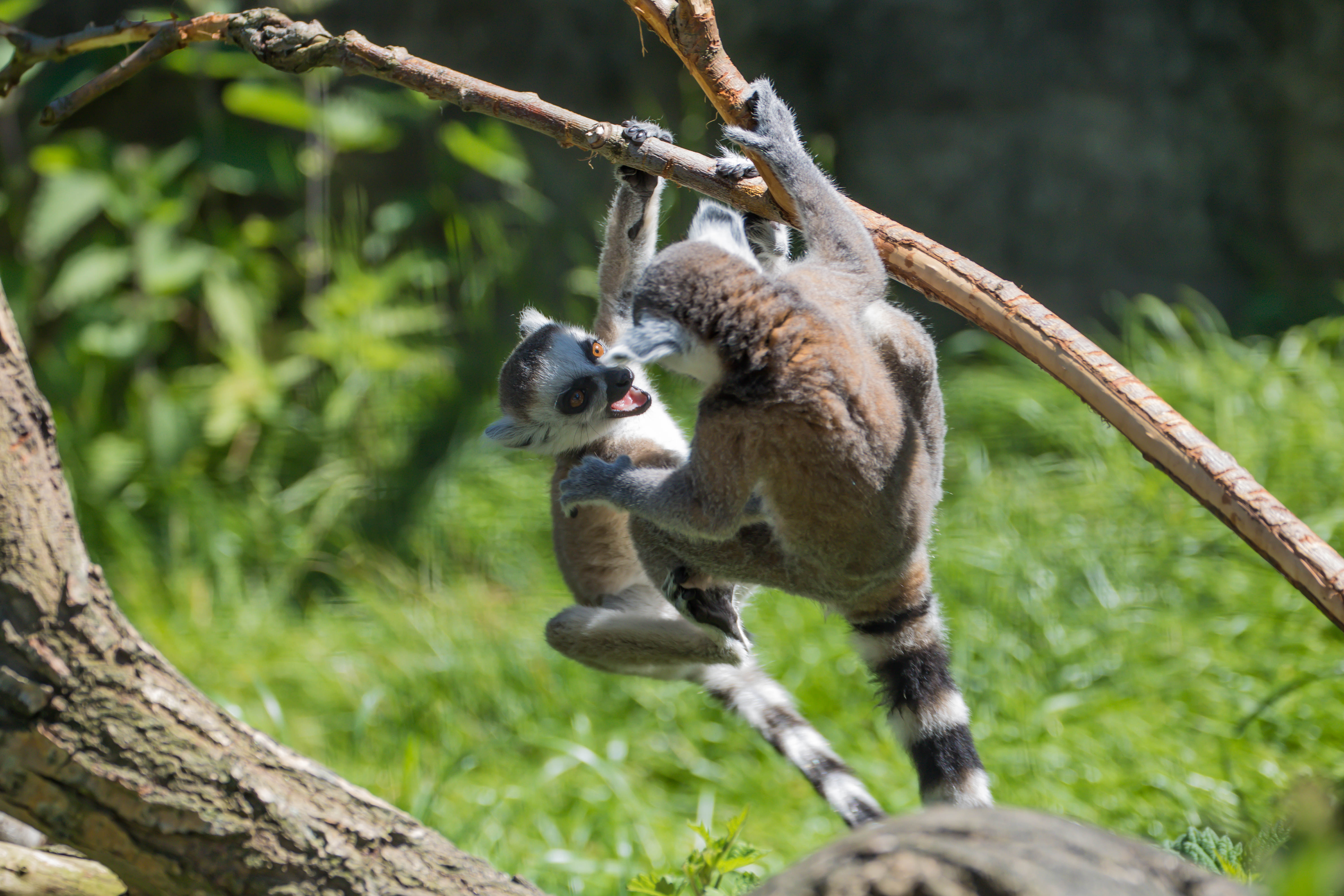
Two juvenile ring-tailed lemurs (Lemur catta) playfighting.

In the ring-tailed lemur (Lemur catta), female infants are found to engage in social play more frequently than male conspecifics, although there are some conflicting reports.

In the family Atelidae, black-handed spider monkeys (Ateles geofroyi) are reported to have male infants are play more frequently than females and are more likely to engage in play bouts. Comparatively, in the Yucatán black howler monkey (Alouatta pigra), there are no known sexed differences. In the mantled howler monkey (Alouatta palliata), males have been reported to play less.

In the family Callitrichidae, males are reported to play more than female common marmosets (Callithrix jacchus). In contrast, female saddle-backed tamarins (Saguinus fuscicollis) are reported to play more often than males.

In the Cebidae family, male tufted capuchins (Cebus apella) spend more time wrestling and chasing than females. This pattern is seen again in the squirrel monkey (Saimiri sciureus).

Captive coppery titi monkeys (Callicebus cupreus) have not shown any sex-related differences in juvenile rough-and-tumble play.

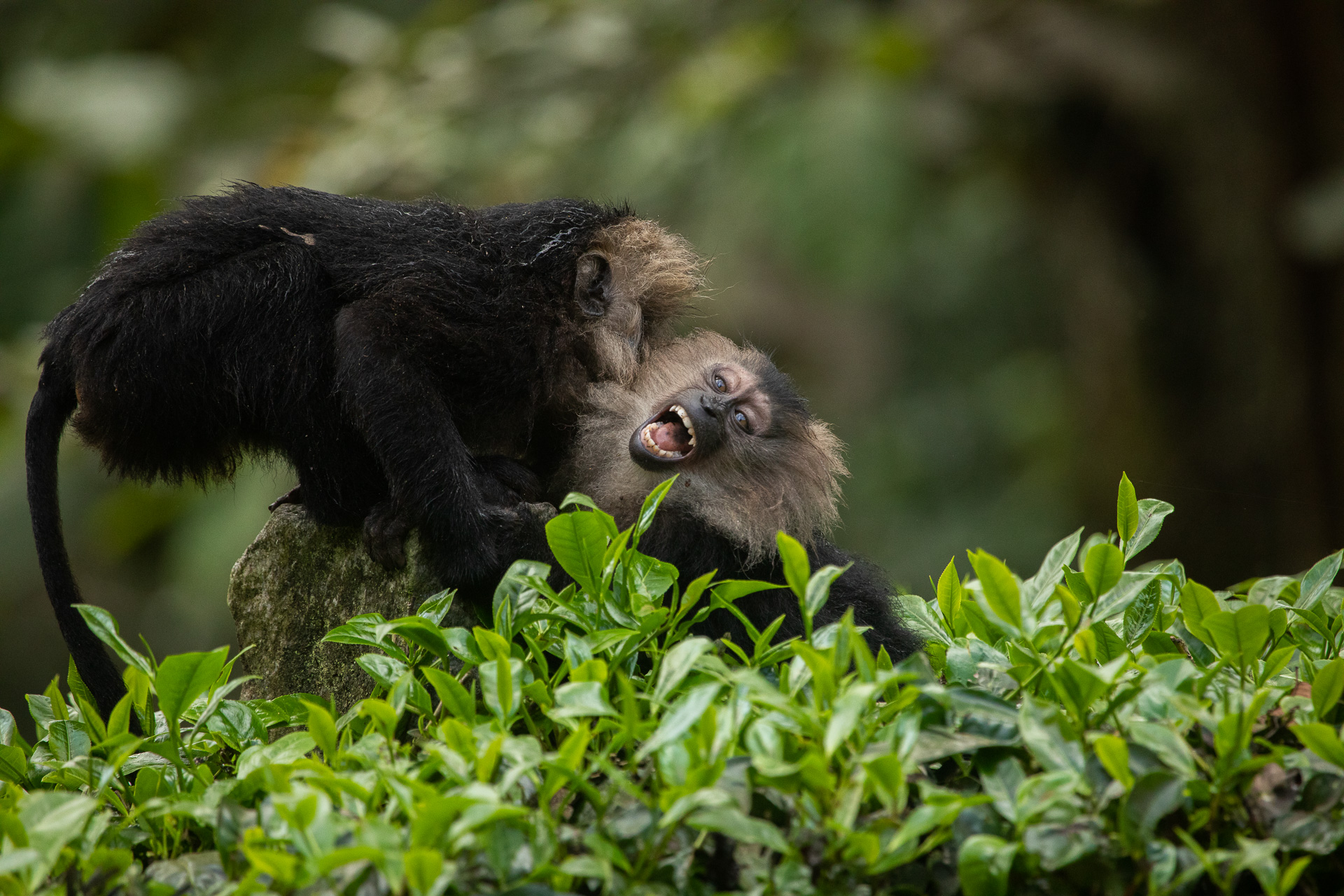
Playfighting using bites in the lion-tailed macaque (Macaca silenus).

Male Japanese macaques (Macaca fuscata) play and initiate more frequently than female conspecifics. This pattern is reported again in the rhesus macaque (Macaca mulata), and that males also had higher frequencies of success in play bouts. These patterns are also reported in the stumptail (Macaca arctoides) and crested (Macaca nigra) macaques.

Juvenile Yellow baboons (Papio cynocephalus) appear to spend the same amount of time rough-and-tumble playing, regardless of sex. In the Hamadryas baboon (Papio hamadryas), males spend more time engaged in dyadic play. This is seen again in the Olive baboon (Papio anubis), where males also engage more frequently in mouth-and-wrestle play.

Geladas (Theropithecus gelada) show no sexed differences in rough-and-tumble play, although some reports suggest that in the wild, males play slightly more often than females.

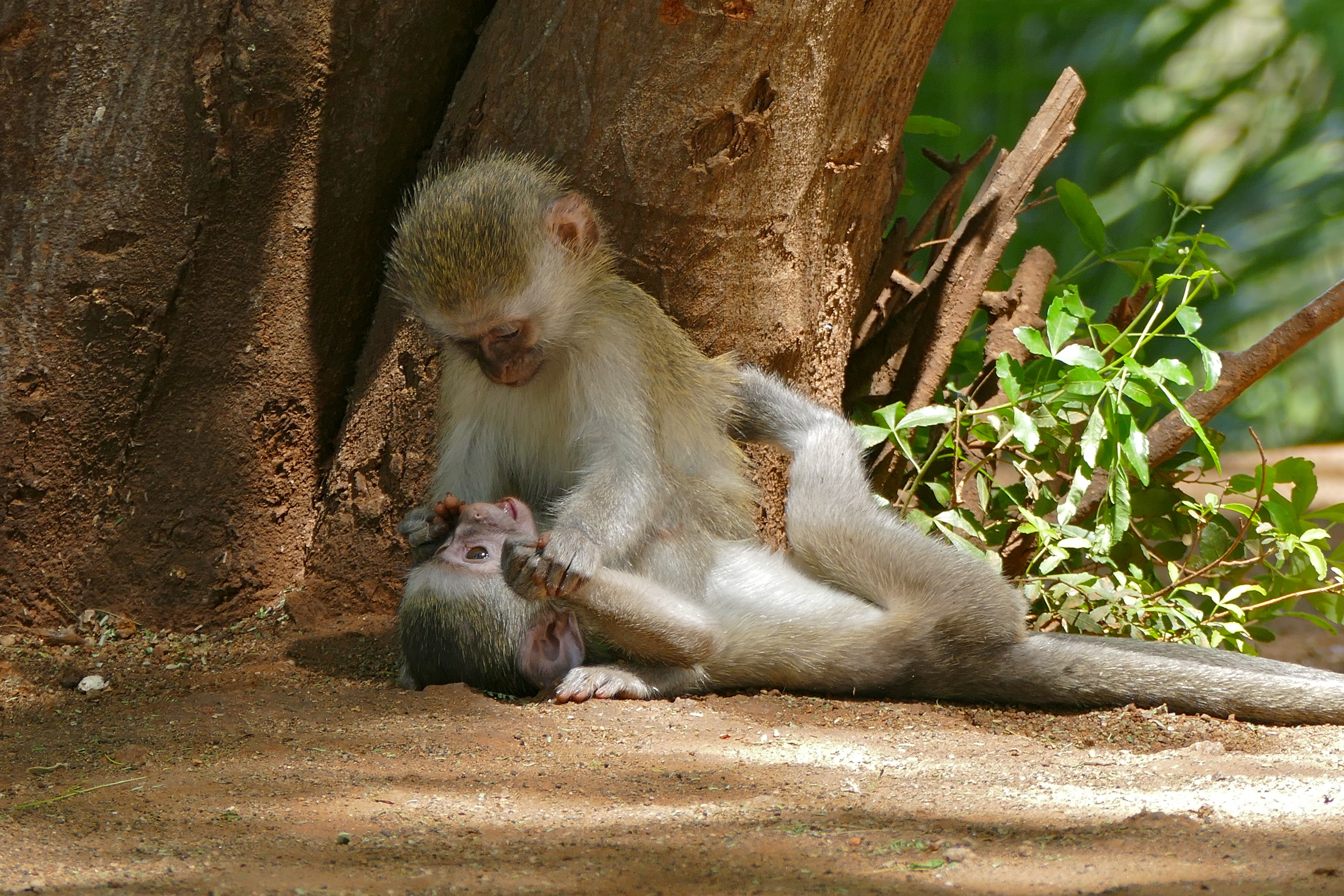
Juvenile Vervet monkeys (Chlorocebus pygerythrus) playfighting.

Vervets (Cercopithecus aethiops) have juvenile males that engage more frequently and more aggressively in rough-and-tumble play. It is suggested however that these patterns are influenced heavily by age in this species, and that females engage in more social play later in their development (48 to 61 months).

Multiple guenon species are known to show rough-and-tumble play, with a male bias. This includes: the samango monkey (Cercopithecus mitis erythrarchus), the talapoin (Miopithecus talapoin), patas (Erythrocebus patas), the redtail monkey (Cercopithecus ascanius) and the blue monkey (Cercopithecus mitis stuhlmanni).

Male sooty mangabeys (Cercocebus atys) are reported to play more often than females. In contrast, there are no reported sex differences in play in immature grey-cheeked mangabeys (Lophocebus albigena).

Sichuan snub-nosed monkeys (Rhinopithecus roxellana) have a male bias towards rough-and-tumble play. There is no reported bias in the similarly related species the black-and-white colobus monkeys (Colobus guereza) or red colobus monkeys (Procolobus rufomitratus).

In chimpanzees (Pan troglodytes), males are known to engage more frequently in play than females. Age, setting, components of play and age group are all known factors that affect how long and how often immature chimpanzees engage in rough-and-tumble play.

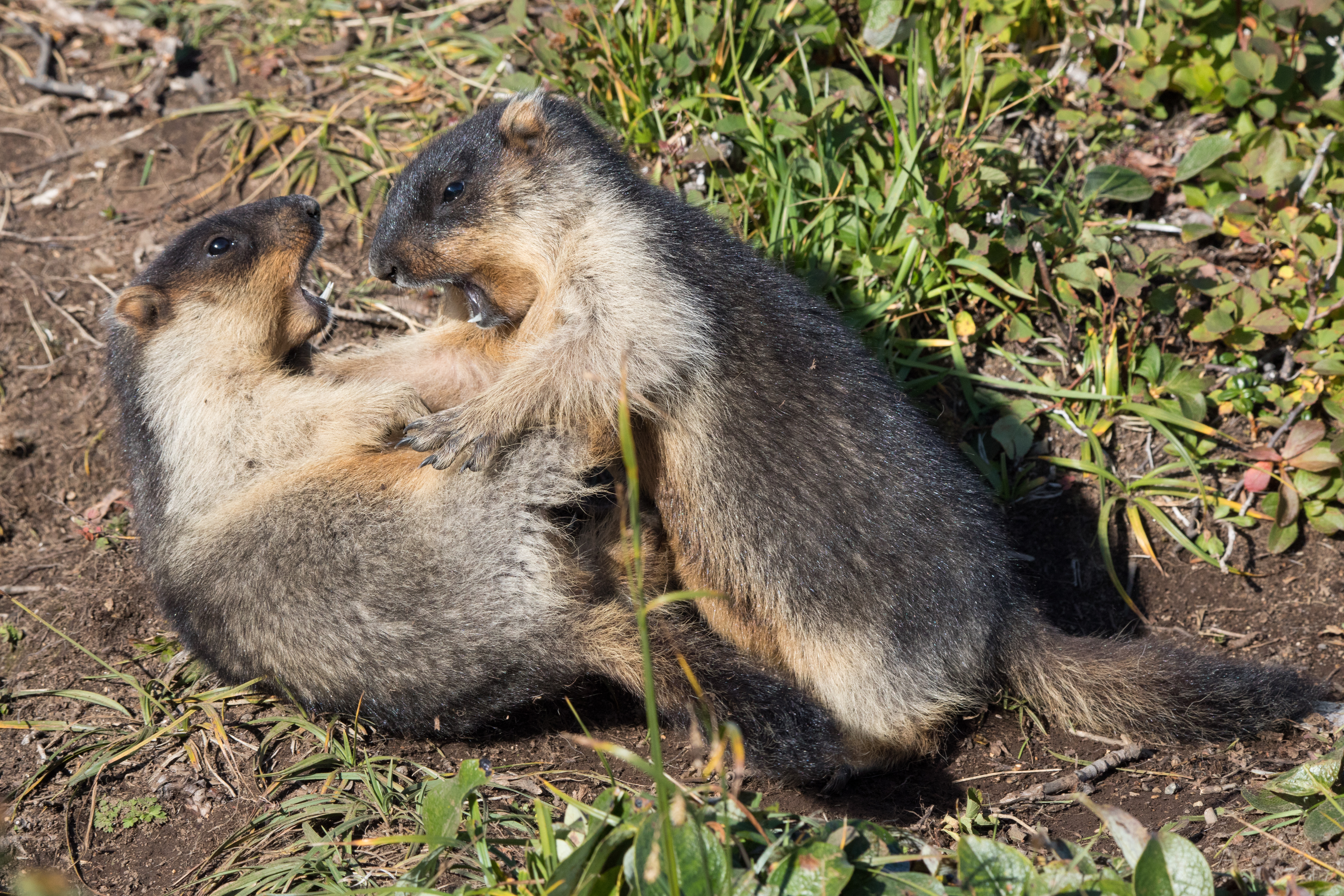
Black-capped marmots (Marmota camtschatica) engaging in play-fighting.

=== Rodents ===
Rough-and-tumble play has been observed in captive prairie voles (Microtus ochrogaster) and wild capybara (Hydrochoerus hydrochaeris), irrespective of sex. In wild yellow-bellied marmosets (Marmota flaviventris), male yearlings participate in bouts more frequently than female conspecifics.

In Columbian ground squirrels (Spermophilus columbianus), reports vary, with some suggesting that males engage and participate in rough-and-tumble play more frequently, while others suggest there is no significant observed sex bias. Belding's ground squirrels (Urocitellus beldingi) also engage in juvenile rough-and-tumble play.

Results from captive golden hamsters (Mesocricetus auratus) suggest that males engage more frequently in bouts and longer than females. This pattern is also observed in the juvenile rough-and-tumble play behavior of captive hooded rats (Rattus norvegicus).

=== Cetaceans (Whales and dolphins) ===
Low levels of social play have been recorded in both sexes of bottlenose dolphin (Tursiops truncatus) calves.

Rough-and-tumble play has been observed in belugas (Delphinapterus leucas), in both juveniles and adults.

=== Chiroptera (Bats) ===
Rough-and-tumble play has been observed in the common vampire bat (Desmodus rotundus), with a male bias towards initiation.

=== Dasyuromorphia (Carnivorous marsupials) ===
In captive kowaris (Dasyuroides byrnie), rough-and-tumble play has been observed in both sexes of juveniles. Similarly, juvenile rough-and-tumble play has been reported in both sexes of spotted-tail quolls (Dasyurus maculatus).

=== Diprotodontia (Marsupials) ===
In captive, red-necked wallabies (Macropus rufogriseus banksianus) rough-and-tumble play is reported. This play behaviour is more common in males, with juvenile females rarely observed engaging.

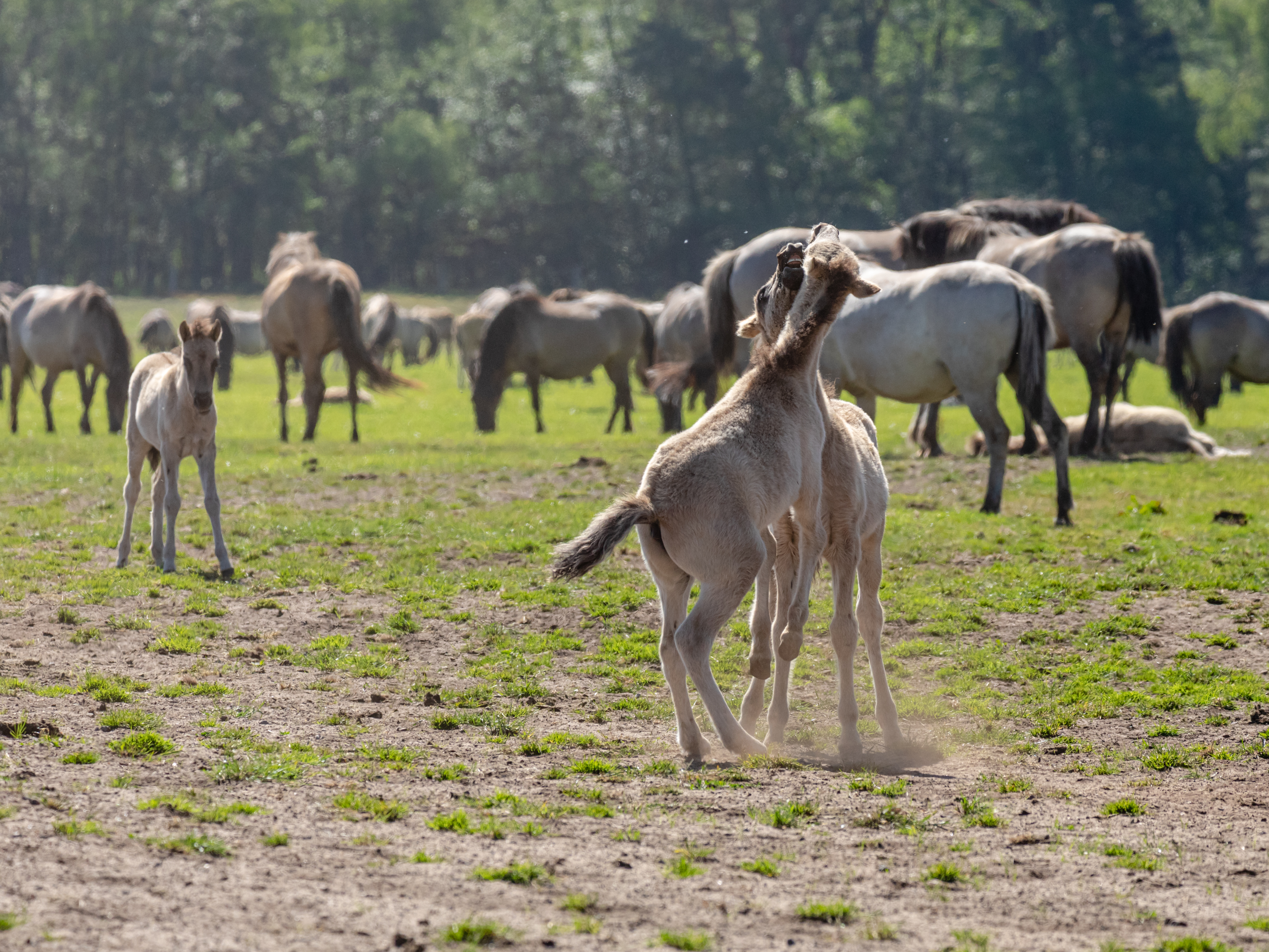
Example of two horse foals engaging in play fighting.

Playfighting has been reported in the red kangaroo (Macropus rufus) between mother and offspring.

=== Perissodactyla (Odd-toed ungulates) ===
Multiple studies have investigated rough-and-tumble play in horses (Equus caballus). One study reports that male Jeju pony foals are more likely to engage in this kind of play after grooming compared to female conspecifics. Another study reports that juvenile male Icelandic horses engage in rough-and-tumble play more frequently than juvenile females. This pattern has also been observed in Welsh ponies, Camargue's and feral horses.

=== Artiodactyla (Even-toed ungulates) ===
Play-fighting has been reported in adult and juvenile male goitered gazelles (Gazella subgutturosa). Similarly, it is also reported in juvenile pronghorns (Antilocapra americana) and guanacos (Lama guanicoe).

=== Proboscidea (Elephants) ===
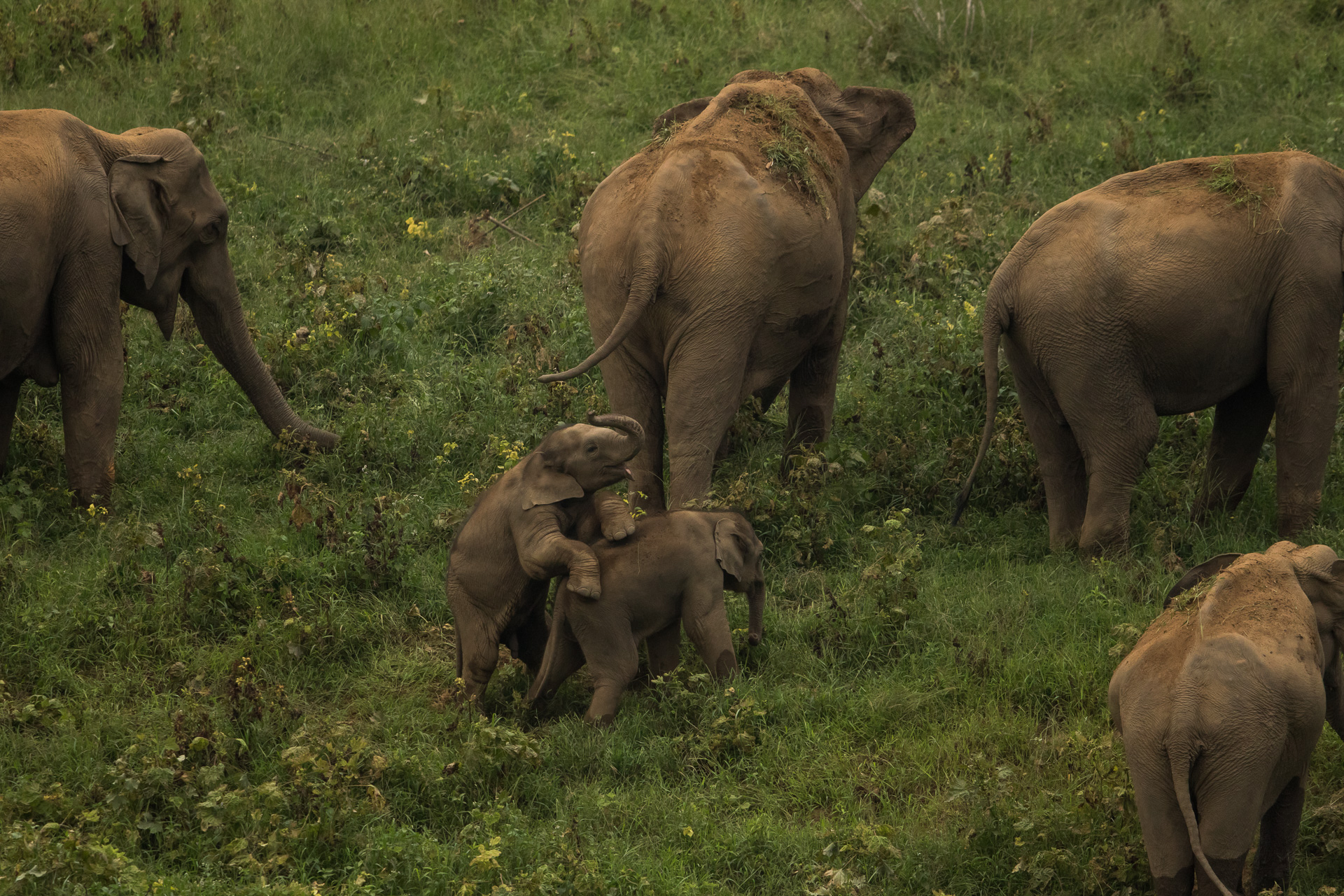
Example of two elephant calves engaging in rough-and-tumble play.

Rough-and-tumble play is observed in both African (Loxodonta africana) and Asian elephant (Elephas maximus) calves. It has been noted that there is an increase in male bias in captive animals compared to wild.
