= James Robertson (psychoanalyst) =

Scottish psychiatric social worker & psychoanalyst (1911-1988)

John Robertson
- John Robertson
- Born: 22 March 1911; Rutherglen, Scotland
- Died: 31 December 1988 (aged 77)
- Citizenship: Scottish
- Known for: Child behavioural researcher, childcare pioneer, filmaker
- Spouse: Joyce Robertson
- Awards: Bowlby-Ainsworth Award 2003
- Scientific career
- Fields: Psychiatry, social work, Medical filming
- Workplaces: Hampstead Child Therapy Clinic, Tavistock Clinic

James Robertson (1911–1988) was a influential psychiatric social worker, psychoanalyst, and filmmaker at the Tavistock Clinic who researched the impact of early separation on child development. Robertson grew up in a working class family in Rutherglen, Scotland and during his youth became a Quaker. From 1930 to 1938, he studied at University of Glasgow. After moving to Birmingham to study, he met his wife Joyce Robertson. When World War II began, Robertson enrolled as a conscientious objector and began working at the Pacifist Service Unit in London, then at Hampstead War Nurseries as a fire warden while his wife worked in the nursery. While there he became interested in child psychiatry and was taugh by Anna Freud. After the war, Robertson enrolled at the London School of Economics to study psychiatry, graduating in 1947 as a psychiatric social worker.

In 1948, Robertson began working with John Bowlby at the Tavistock Clinic, ostensibly to observe mother-child separation. He discovered the mental stress that very young children are subject to during and after separation. He also discovered a number of avoidant, ambivalent and disorientation behaviours. These observations were important in forming attachment theory. Wishing to expose the mental stress young children suffered when separated, Robertson made two films, the first on a tiny girl, Laura, in 1952 "A Two-year-old Goes to Hospital". The film initially encountered resistance within the medical child-care industry but challenged assumptions. In analysing the film, Robertson and Bowlby formed a theory on the responses of children to separation. In a 1959 review of Robertsons film, "A Two-Year-Old Goes to Hospital", paediatrician Donald Winnicott declared that "One seldom meets a nurse or a social worker who has not had an opportunity to see it, and its influence has been very great".

After making the films, Robertson began campaigning for reform of child care. In the late 1950's, a disagreement with Bowlby led the Robertsons to examine the causes of the separation anxiety in very young children. Beginning in 1967, it lead to creation of a further series of films that examined the plight of children who were fostered and those in residential nurseries. This led to the discovery of theory of bonding and the beginning of fostering. In 1975, the Robertsons opened the Robertson centre to advance public understanding of the emotional needs of young children. Bowlby said of him, "(He) was a remarkable person who achieved great things. His sensitive observations and brilliant observations made history, and the courage with which he disseminated – often in the face of ignorant and prejudiced criticism – what were then very unpopular findings, was legendary. He will always be remembered as the man who revolutionised children's hospitals, though he accomplished much else besides. I am personally deeply grateful for all that he did".

== Life ==
James Robertson was born in Rutherglen, Scotland in 22 March 1911, and grew up in a working-class, close-knit loving family where children were cuddled, loved and protected. He intrinsically understood that children needed their mother and was sensitive to pain due to separation. He became a Quaker in his late teens. From 1930 to 1938, Robertson studied extension courses at the University of Glasgow on literature, history, economics, and philosophy. In the Second World War he was registered as a conscientious objector.

In 1939, Robertson met his future wife Joyce Robertson (nee User) in Birmingham, while he was studying the humanities for a year, at the Fircroft College of Adult Education and she was studying at the Hillcroft College for working women. The couple had both been working at the Bournville chocolate factory at the time they met. The couple had had two daughters, Katherine McGilly (born in 1944) and Jean Clelland (born in 1950). Later they had two grandchildren and three great grandchildren.

== Career ==
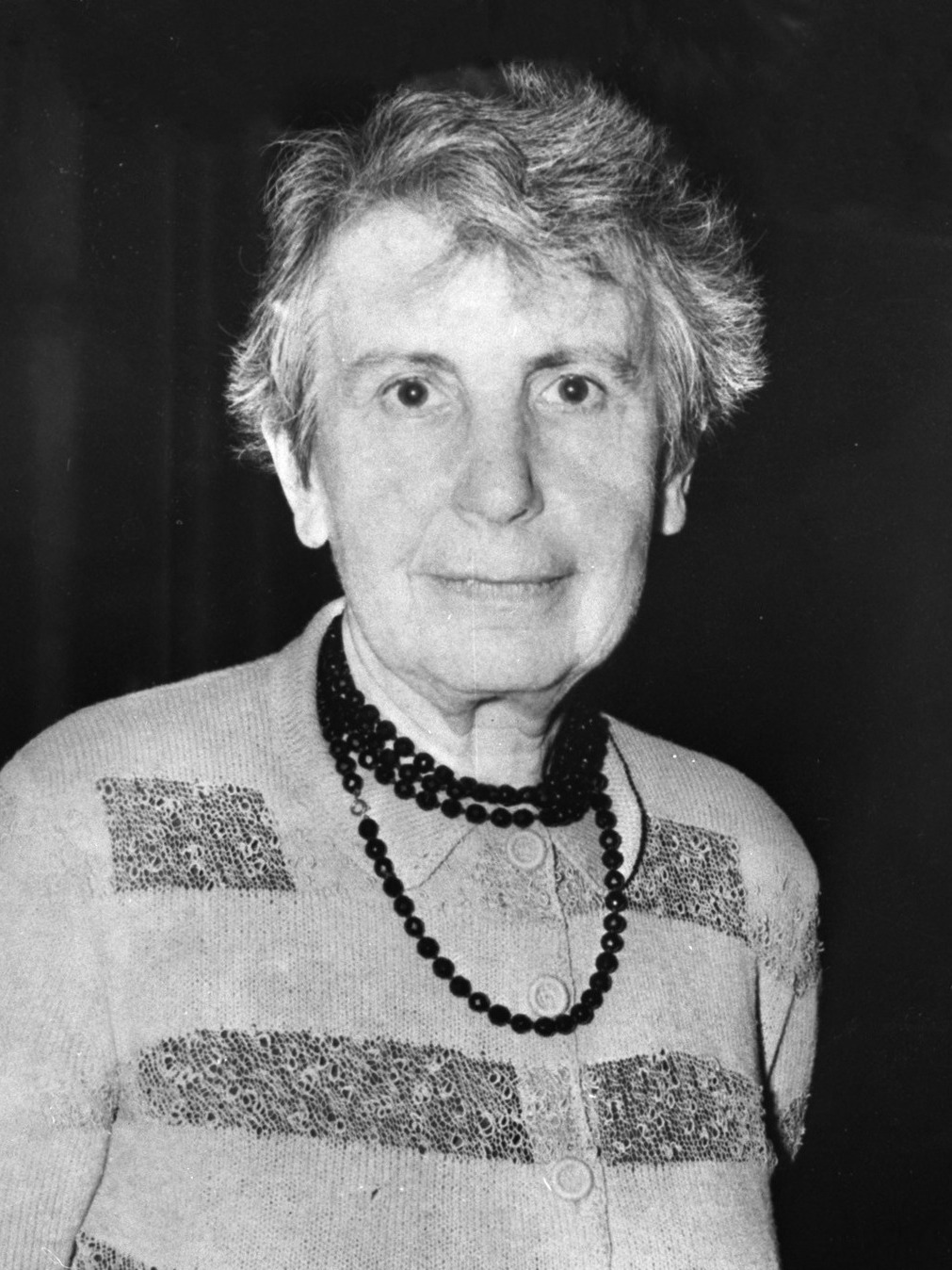
Anna Freud had a considerable influence on Robertson that led him to train as a psychiatric social worker

When World War II broke out, Robertson registered as a conscientious objector. At the start of the work he began working at a Pacifist Service Unit in East London, helping the victims of the bombing and helping to evacuate children who were at risk of bombing to other parts of the uk.

=== Hampstead Wartime Nurseries ===
In January 1941 the couple began working with Anna Freud in the Hampstead War Nurseries and remained there for the rest of the war. Joyce was a student caring for the infants who had lost family life due to the war, while James began by organising the firewatching at the nursery and as a general maintenance man. Freud had a particular reliance on the couple as they were English and from a working-class background, unlike many of the émigrés who arrived to work at nurseries. Freud used them to translate both cultural and linguistic differences that were unknown to Freud as an emigre herself. Robertson also acted in the role of a father figure to many of the children without fathers.

Both James and Joyce benefited from teaching by Anna Freud and Dorothy Burlingham in child psychiatry. They also learned more prosaic subjects like common children's diseases, first aid and anatomy as well as subjects like the Montessori education method. Freud required that all her staff to maintain records of observations of children's behaviour that were recorded on small cards that were then discussed during weekly meetings and then indexed. This led to Robertson receiving meticulous training in naturalistic observation. The collaboration with Freud in discussing the psychological development of children, led Robertson to consider taking further training. During the war he completed a diploma qualification in social science.

In 1945, the couples thirteen-month-old baby, Katherine had to go into hospital for a week for treatment. The couple were appalled to discover that they could not visit their child. Indeed, this was considered normal practice. The reason given was the prevention of infection. This was illustrated in January 1940 when Ayr County Hospital decided not to admit visitors to children, that resulted in an editorial in The Lancet. This was widely practiced in UK hospitals. Robertson decided from that point onwards to only research mother/child separation due to hospital admission.

At the end of the war when the wartime nursery was shutting down, Robertson had the task of either returning the children to their families, or seeking families who would adopt the child. Out of the 191 children remaining at the nursery at the end of the war, Robertson returned 101 children to their parents. After the war, Robertson won a scholarship to the London School of Economics after the war to study psychiatry, achieving a mental health certificate and graduating in 1947 as a psychiatric social worker. After his graduation he began training in psychoanalysis at the British Psychoanalytical Society (BPS) with the help of Freud. He became an associate member of the BPS in 1952 and achieved full membership in 1970.

=== Tavistock clinic ===
In February 1948, Robertson was a co-founder along with John Bowlby's of the Tavistock Child Development Research Unit at the Tavistock Clinic. Bowlby had received a small grant from the Sir Halley Stewart Trust in 1948 to start researching the effects of separation and maternal deprivation of small children aged between 1 and 3 years that Bowlby called his sanatorium study. Robertson had been employed by Bowlby to make observations on separated young children and report the findings to Bowlby. Robertson had been trained in a strictly Freudian view of psychoanalysis that was not shared with Bowlby's. Bowlby at the time believed in what became known as the object relations theory of psychoanalysis that was developed in the early 1930s and 1940s by Melanie Klein and Donald Winnicott and formalised in 1952 by Scottish psychiatrist Ronald Fairbairn. Although for most practical purposes he was in agreement with Freud, when it came to discussing theory they had widely differing views. The German-American child psychologist Christoph Heinicke who specialised in mother/child separation (and would later join Bowlby's team) also disagreed with Bowlby's theoretical conclusions but agreed with the empirical data, but again for practical purposes agreed with Bowlby on everything else. This perhaps reflects in Robertson and Bowlby's relationship and how each viewed different theoretical aspects of mother/child separation. Certainly they complemented each other work, Bowlby as theorist who would use Robertson material that he compiled from observation. Also at Tavistock was psychoanalyst Isobel Menzies, who studied how the stress of working in hospital causes anxieties in nurses and how they dealt with it. Robertson used Menzies insights in his research.

=== Young children in hospital ===
Beginning in February 1948, Robertson began observing young children at Central Middlesex and Harefield hospitals and made similar visits to local short and long-stay hospitals as well as residential nurseries. At the time, visiting of children in hospitals was still severely restricted. This was again illustrated by a 1949 letter to The Spectator by H.G. Monroe Davies who published a survey of visiting times to London Hospitals for parents. Some allowed no visiting, some no visiting for under three year olds, others only 1 or 1.5 hours visiting a week, others - twice a week, but it all cases it was extremely restrictive. This caused great distress to the young patients, and it was well known in the community that a child could be 'changed' by a stay in hospital. However, little of this disquiet reached the hospitals, and later commentators would speak of 'an emotional resistance to the awareness of children's emotional needs and distress. The strength of this resistance is vividly illustrated by the work of James Robertson'.

When James Robertson first entered the children's ward to make observations, he was shocked by the unhappiness he saw among the youngest children, in particular those aged under three years old. The competent, efficient doctors and nurses gave good medical care but seemed unaware of the suffering around them. Robertson described his experience:

In a ward that was busy with the movement of nurses, and with the activities of the older children, these younger ones sat in their cots desolate and tearful or deeply silent. They did not understand why the parents who had cared for them were not there; their needs were immediate and they had no time sense to help them understand that their parents would come tomorrow or the next day. They were overwhelmed. If a nurse stopped beside a silent toddler, he would usually burst into tears at the human contact and the nurse would be rebuked for 'making him unhappy'

==== Naturalistic observations ====
During this project, Robertson observed more than 50 children in both long and short stay wards, although not all of them were intensively observed. When Robertson and Bowlby analysed the observations they concluded that when the child lost their mother and their efforts to regain that contact failed, they responded by inhibiting their feelings. Bowlby assigned the term "Detachment" to this phase. In 1950, developmental psychologist Mary Ainsworth joined the clinic in 1950. She was assigned to analyse Robertson's observations and tried to persuade Bowlby that the term was misleading as she believed an inhibition was present that blocked intense feelings of attachment, i.e those intense feelings were still present but inhibited, whereas detachment indicated separation from the care-giver. Robertson and Bowlby believed this inhibition was responsible for the tic-like movements and avoidant behaviour and it was Robertson's qualitative assessment that the longer it went on for the child who received less comfort from hospital staff, the more psychological disturbance the child would experience at home. The child became more aggressive and anxious, would seek less affection, which would likely to occur at odd moments and without explanation. An example was "Bobby" who would punch his father for a particular reason, but would smile and severely punch his mother, randomly and seemingly for no reason.

When Robertson completed the study, Bowlby uses a quantitative metric on Robertson's data, based on IQ and teachers ratings of the children, to form a hypothesis that could prove the children would suffer consequences in later life due to separation, but was unable to do so. The results were withheld from publication. However, the qualitative results of the naturalistic observations by Robertson were considered by Ainsworth to be "entrancing’ and ‘deeply impressive". She stated:

I was tremendously impressed with this material. Jimmy was a social worker at the time but he has since been qualified as an analyst. His observations were the most sensitive direct observations I had ever encountered. I don’t think I have ever encountered anyone who was more perceptive.

One of the most influential observations Robertson made concerned "ambivalent anxiety/preoccupation" and avoidant behaviour that manifested as being withdrawn. After the child was separated from his mother, followed by protest, the behaviours were seen over an extended period of time that decreased as time went on. This led to a preoccupation of the child with the caregiver. Upon reunion, the child would display avoidant behaviour that could lead to withdrawal when the child returned home.

===== Other behaviours =====
As well as ambivalent and avoidant behaviours, Robertson observed a number of other behaviours that was later important for the formation of attachment theory. These were behaviours associated with separation but also reunion. For over a decade, between the mid-1950s and the mid-1960s, Bowlby would record these observations in a book, writing and rewriting them as the context changed and new knowledge emerged. The core of these behaviours that Robertson observed was one of disorientation. Both Bowlby and Robertson suggested they indicated some form disruption of the attachment response, but weren't sure what it signified. The lack of clarity by Bowlby, led him to prevent the book being published, which resulted in a gradual separation by Robertson from the Tavistock Clinic in the early 1960's. Ainsworth saw the lack of publication as a major loss to development psychology.

===== Disorientation =====
Robertson noted that children could change between ambivalent and avoidant behaviour without an external input. An example patient, Jacqueline, after five months at home, would seek "baby cuddles" from her mother in the evening and daytime, but between the two extremes of behaviour, of being a baby and being detached and independent, she would exhibit little evidence of a moderate behaviour expected of a young child. Essentially she would swing between the two behaviours.

Robertson also observed disorientation during a reunion between mother and child. During a visit by Laura's mother Robertson described the disorientation:

One of the most striking features about Laura is that, despite being only two years and five months old, she contrived much of the time to control the expression of her grief. Mother announced “I’m going home now”. Laura’s expression was instantly tense and unhappy. Mother insisted “Don’t cry” and pointed an admonitory finger; Laura nodded uncertainly. As her mother left and before she was out of sight Laura turned away with an expression of the deepest misery on her face. The relief of tears, which would have come to most children of that age in that situation, was not available to Laura. As she tried to keep her feelings in check she idly turned the pages of a book, fingered her hair, and both hands fluttered impotently before her face as if she had been momentarily disoriented

Robertson thought that avoidant behaviour was often associated with disorientation and interpreted these behaviours as repressing attachment behaviour. A different child was fearful when she was reunited with her mother. Robertson believed that the child thought the mother was a stranger due the attachment behaviour being repressed. He noted:

When they reached home and Mary saw her mother for the first time in six weeks, she screamed and refused to go near her. This rejection continued for several days during which she treated her mother so much as though she was a frightening stranger … Only after a week did Mary begin to show a wish to be near her mother. Then her behaviour moved to the other extreme and she followed mother about continuously as if afraid to let her out of her sight. She became increasingly aggressive towards her sisters, and made several vicious attacks on her new baby brother.

Another behaviour he observed was the child freezing when scared instead of seeking help with an caregiver. This was evidenced by a patient, Vicky, who had returned from hospital:

On the third day her grandmother took her out. Although she had wanted to see the traffic, when she was halfway across a road she suddenly became petrified by fear, and refused to move, while the cars stopped and hooted and people stared.

Another observation that Robertson observed was the child seeking care from strangers instead of the caregiver, a form of disorientation. Robertson called this "disinhibited social engagement". An example patient was Jacqueline:

...unlike ordinary children of this age, when hurt she did not go to her mother for comfort. Indeed, on an occasion when she bruised a finger quite badly Jacqueline did not turn to her mother but to a visitor who happened to be in the room.

He believed that some children who had been in hospital would make shallow relationships with everybody was present. An example patient was Stephanie, who:

Although she had not seen me for 18 months, she was immediately friendly and asked for a ride in my car: she was driven around the avenues without showing anxiety, a response mother commented upon. The parents also expressed a related concern—that she was unable to concentrate on anything for more than a very short time. They linked this, with considerable alarm, to the fact that she had been wandering away from home.

==== Film – A Two-year-old Goes to Hospital (1952) ====
Robertson decided to make a film documentary of a young child's stay in hospital. He sought to create an objective film that would enable visual communication to take place in a way that the spoken word could not. Bowlby insisted that the film production was carefully planned so they could not be accused of any bias. A child was randomly selected for the experiment and a clock was always visible to show when the filming took place, which always took place at specific times. With a grant of £150 from Thomas Main, he purchased a Paillard Bolex H16 16mm cine camera and 80 minutes of black-and-white film. In August 1952, he made the film, shot it silently then added commentary later. Robertson called it a "A Two-year-old Goes to Hospital". (Note: The film was reviewed after a showing by Australian psychologist William Andrew Dibden who defined a complete day-by-day breakdown of Laura's emotional state.) Before releasing the film, Robertson released "A Two-Year-Old Goes to Hospital: A Guide to the Film" to guide the audience to understand what was being conveyed.

The patient was Laura, a scientific pseudonym, aged 2, in hospital for eight days for surgical repair of a umbilical hernia in Amersham Hospital. She is initially filmed at her home, then filmed in the morning and afternoon at regular intervals from when she was admitted to her departure. The hospital treatment was considered exemplary without any operational complications. Robertson and Bowlby were planning to abandon the documentary since Laura did not cry much. When her husband and Bowlby showed Joyce Robertson the film, it was Joyce who made the critical breakthrough in realising why Laura was not crying, being a desperate attempt by the tiny girl to control her feelings. In the film Robertson observes the mother leaving the child, assured by the nurse that she would settle down when she leaves. When the mother does leave, Laura reacts violently, protesting and her mood changes for the worst. By the end of the stay it appears that Laura is withdrawn and depressed, shaken in her trust. Laura also exhibits tic-like movements caused by stress.

For two days after Laura left the hospital, Laura was "unusually anxious and irritable. Her voice took on a higher pitch. She slept badly. She soiled herself several times. She became distressed if mother was even momentarily out of sight". Three months later, Laura's mother had another baby. When she returned from hospital, Laura displayed avoidant behaviour, particularly with her mother and seemed to be disorientated. Robert observed that:

Laura was very excited and keen to return home. Half an hour later she arrived and the mother could hear her banging on the outside door and calling “Mummy, Mummy”. But when her mother opened the door, Laura looked at her blankly and said, “But I want my Mummy”. For the next two days she did not seem to recognise her mother, and although quite friendly was completely detached. This naturally upset her mother very much. When the father came home an hour or two after Laura’s return, Laura was for a few moments mute toward him but then recovered quickly and was friendly and sure of him.

Robertson showed the film to Laura's parents six months later and when Laura caught a glimpse of it, she became angry and distressed stating: "'Where was you all the time, Mummy? Where was you?' Then she burst into loud crying and turned to her father for comfort." When Laura was shown the film again when she was 16, she again grabbed her father's tie as she had done when she was in hospital.

Robertson later wrote of the experience of making the film:

Young children tend to be seen en masse and only fleetingly as people. The view en masse can also be a way of defending against hurt. Visual material is much more effective than the spoken or printed word in piercing resistance in the field of childcare.

==== Film distribution ====
In 29 February 1952, an early version of the film that had not been edited, was shown to the British Psychoanalytical Society in London. On 5 March 1952, Bowbly read the paper "A Two-Year-Old Goes to Hospital" to the society to describe its function. In the summer of 1952, the film was shown alongside René Spitz Grief: A Peril in Infancy (a film about motherless babies) at the International Seminar on Mental Health and Infant Development held between 19 July and 10 August in Chichester. In reviewing the film, cultural anthropologist Margaret Mead described how the audience believed a similar experience could happen to their own children. On 28 November 1952, the film had its official premiere at the paediatric section of the Royal Society of Medicine in London to an audience of medical professionals where it was introduced by Bowlby who described its setting. Contemporary reviews commented on the film's restrained and objective style, noting that although the child appeared composed for her age, the extent of her distress was evident. According to The lancet reaction to the film was controversial and ranged from disbelief to anger. There was even calls for the film to be withdrawn. The BMJ described the film as a detailed depiction of the observable manifestations of emotional processes in infants separated from their families and wondered if it led to permanent damage in children and whether it was common effect of hospital admission. Both The Lancet and the BMJ toned down the level of anger in their responses. Anna Freud, writing in the The International Journal of Psychoanalysis, referred to it as a connected and credible account of stress and separation anxiety and complained how often the child's illness of the body had to be addressed before the child emotional state could be considered. Nursing Times reviewers observed that the film challenged assumptions about children's adjustment to hospitalisation. Robertson described the premiere as:

...the film encountered much resistance. Some accepted its truths, but the majority reacted negatively. Various speakers said hotly that I had filmed an atypical child of atypical parents in an atypical ward: that young children in their wards were happy: that they had never heard parents complain; that I had slandered paediatrics; and the film should be withdrawn.

Due to the negative reaction of the medical community in the UK, the film was not distributed to the general public until 1959. It was reasoned that this was to ensure that child hospitalization could be reformed without segments of the medical community resisting that reform effort. The British Film Institute considered the film was of "national and historic importance" and archived it. When the World Health Organization saw the film, they bought the distribution rights and provided funding to distribute it in Africa and India.

==== Responses to children separated from their parents ====
Robertson and Bowlby saw that children initially protested at separation from the parents, but then settled, becoming quiet and compliant. However, Robertson saw this as a danger signal. After several years of observations, he formed a theory based on the typical sequence of responses of children aged between 18 and 24 months who had lost the care of their mother.

In 1952, Robertson and Bowlby published "Responses of Young Children to Separation From Their Mothers". Robertson theorised that breaks in a child's attachment bonds were emotional responses to 'phases of protest, despair and detachment'.

- In the protest phase, the child is visibly distressed, cries and calls for his mother ' – distress, angry crying, searching, trying to find the mother and get her back'. The child reunited at this stage will 'usually be quite difficult for a time. It's as though he is punishing the mother for going away. When he's got those feelings off his chest, he returns to normality'.
- If however 'the separation continues for longer...the child may go on to the stage known as "despair" where they very quiet, withdrawn, miserable and apathetic. They stops playing and seems to lose interest in everything'. The child gives up hope of his or her mother returning and may appear to be "settling down", to the satisfaction of unenlightened staff. In fact, 'when he gets home, he'll take much longer to get over the experience. He'll cling to his mother more', and before recovering will 'usually then have to go through the protest phase on the way'.
- In the denial/detachment phase, the child shows more interest in his surroundings and interacts with others, but seems hardly to know the mother when she visits or care when she leaves, which is why 'the third stage – "detachment" – is the most serious'. Apparently, the child seems not to need any mothering at all; but, 'in fact, he only seems to have recovered, and at the cost of killing his love for his mother'. When eventually reunited with the family, 'the child can seem quite changed and now appears superficial, emotionally distant'. His relationships with others are shallow and untrusting. 'This is the most difficult stage to undo'.

Robertson's research was met with hostility by the medical profession. Even his colleagues at the Tavistock Clinic did not feel the same sense of urgency. They did accept 'that anything that breaks up the child's life into fragments is harmful' and understood that mothers knew this, but they failed to pick up the visual cues that were so obvious to Robertson.

In April 1953, Robertson published "Some responses of young children to loss of maternal care" in the Nursing Times.

Between 1953 and 1954 Robertson visited paediatric professionals in Denmark, France, Germany, Netherlands and Norway and Yugoslavia to promote the film. He found the same lack of knowledge in the professionals that limited their effectiveness.

In September 1955, Robertson forwarded a letter "Young Children in Long-term Hospitals" to the Nursing Times in response to a reader, a nurse, who didn't believe that the conditions expressed in the "A Two-year-old Goes to Hospital" film applied to her institution — a hospital with long-term patients. Robertson explained that continuous uninterrupted care was important and it was impossible to assume that although the child may seem cheerful and happy they could be actually mentally detached and have difficulties when returning to their parents. He described how the film could be used by the nursing profession to enable them to spot these behaviours, which were particularly prevalent in long-term hospitals and begin changing in order to address the problem.

=== Film – Going to Hospital with Mother (1958) ===
A key figure who was present at the Royal Society of Medicine meeting and who saw the film was Dermod MacCarthy, consultant paediatrician at Amersham Hospital. MacCarthy had originally reacted with hostility to the film, until his ward sister Ivy Morris who attended the meeting with him, informed him that Robertson was right and that she allowed mothers to tend to their children when he was not present. From that moment, MacCarthy could not look at the young children on his wards without being reminded of the film and so decided to convert the wards to enable the mothers to stay in the hospital with their children. MacCarthy began inviting mothers to stay with their child in wards in 1950. and after a couple of years became an exponent of open wards In 1956, MacCarthy invited Robertson to visit his wards. That same year, Robertson made a request to MacCarthy to make another film in his ward. Robertson described how he had:

.... waited a long time for the opportunity to make a film of this kind, and my main reason for deciding that Amersham General Hospital provided the setting I wanted was the fact that there every mother of a child under 5 years is invited to come into residence, with no attempt to discriminate between the "good" and the so-called "over-anxious" mother. This readiness to deal with a wide range of types and temperaments appealed to both my humane and scientific interest in the subject.

The patient was Sally, a 20-month old girl who was admitted to hospital for an umbilical hernia operation. However, in this film, the child is admitted with her mother into the newly designed mother-baby units in MacCarthy wards that were made up of transparent cubicles, one of 8 in the ward. Each cubicle has a cot for the child, a bed for the mother, a washbasin and easychair to relax in. The new film called "Going to Hospital With Mother" was filmed in the autumn of 1958 in the same manner as the previous films. Robertson showed

that it is the presence or absence of a mother that matters to a child of this age,” as “at no time does Sally show any of the fretfulness or withdrawal commonly seen in unaccompanied young patients.

==== Review of "Going to Hospital with Mother" ====
In 1959, English paediatrician and psychoanalyst Donald Winnicott reviewed the film. Winnicott described how influential the film was and how many in the nursing and social work profession had now seen it. After describing a synopsis of the film, Winnicott described how relaxed Sally is, the opposite of normal tensions seen in Laura. He then describes how the ward sister is critical in implementing this type of mother-child arrangement on the ward and how the nurse-parent relationship can lead in providing sensitive help for the child. Lastly, he describes how Robertsons book "Young children in Hospital" outlines the central thesis that Robertsons is hoping to achieve in making the film.

The editors of The Lancet reviewed the film, stating "even the most sceptical audience could hardly fail to be impressed by this second film".

==== Companion thesis ====
In 1958, Robertson published the first edition of "Young Children in Hospital", as a companion to the "Going to Hospital with Mother" film. The companion guide has two parts - the first part is an examination of the current state of care of children being admitted to hospital, the second part is a prescriptive definition of the changes needed in hospital practice to ensure children's mental health is not damaged by separation from their mother while being treated.

In the first parts, Robertson calls for a guiding principle in the medical professional that can meet the needs of young children, when they are admitted to hospital. He then uses case studies and Robertsons research with Laura, Patricia and Barbara to examine how the current system causes so much emotional distress in the child, leading to a description of the 'phases of protest, despair and detachment' cycle. This leads to an examination of the dangers of hospital stay for the young child in a short stay and long stay hospitals. The second section starts with the need to keep the mother and child together in hospital, examines how the medical professional have been resistant to this idea and show how the open children's wards at Amersham hospital effectively ensure the child's needs are addressed. Robertson then introduces "Going to Hospital with Mother" and case report by Joyce Robertson "A Mother's Observations on the Tonsillectomy of Her Four-Year-Old Daughter" on the couples experience of taking their own child into hospital, that they use to illustrate the changes and training that will be required of the medical profession to properly address a child's emotional and mental needs when they are admitted to hospital.

=== Platt Report ===
The glacial process recognising the need for reform in welfare of children in hospital in the 1950s and earlier, had finally reached the level of the government when they decided to investigate the matter. Minister of Health Robin Turton commissioned the Central Health Services Council, that was part of the Ministry of Health, to establish a committee to undertake a special study of the arrangements made in hospital for children and the very young and to make recommendations to those hospitals.

On 12 June 1956, Sir Harry Platt, an orthopaedic surgeon who was President of the Royal College of Surgeons of England, formed the committee to examine the welfare of children going into hospital that went beyond their medical needs. Their recommendations became the Platt Report, published in 1959. In 1956, Robertson, representing the Tavistock clinic, contributed a memorandum of recommendations based on his research to the committee and also showed them the two films. In 1958, Robertson formalised the memorandum into the book titled: "Young children in hospital" that was designed as a companion to the second film. The book was translated into nine languages. The rationale of Robertson's memo had largely the same sentiments that was expressed in a report "Maternal Care and Mental Health" - on maternal deprivation, that Bowlby submitted to the WHO in 1951. Robertson posited that family life was a microcosm that existed with a larger society and that child development as an adult into that society was dependent on a care and love the young child received. He argued that the child would have better confidence and capacity for forming relationships as an adult. Yet if the child was admitted to hospital and separated from their mother, the psychological damage might affect the child in later life. He simply advised that mothers should be allowed to stay with their children in hospital. He concluded:

...the presence of even an 'anxious' mother is infinitely better for the young child than she should be absent.

The Platt committee accepted all of the recommendations prepared by Robertson in 1959.

=== Campaigning ===
In 1958, Robertson prepared a programme for the BBC on the two films, but was informed by them they had decided not to proceed after receiving medical advice, as they were worried that the programme would cause too much anxiety in the general public. Beginning in January 1961, Robertson began publishing a series of articles in the The Observer. The first starting on the 15 January titled "The Truth of Settling In", described the current situation and the need for maternal contact in children under two years. The second and third articles were published on the 22 and 29 January and advocated for closer contact between mother and child and "How parents can help now". The last printed on 12 February 1961, was a review of several readers letters by Robertson and called for parents to take a more active role with the provocative title: "Now over to mothers". In the same period, Robertson also wrote an article for the The Guardian where he advocated for parents to push for the implementation of the Platt Report. By that point, the BBC realised there was significant public sentiment with Robertson as the locus. So in March 1961, the BBC invited Robertson to a live show where he would present sequences from his film and give a talk. Ronald MacKeith, a paediatric neurologist, MacCarthy and Ivy Morris were also invited to discuss the films. As the show was live, Robertson, against instructions, spoke directly to the camera to ask parents to inform them of their experiences. The response was 400 letters. Robertson published them the following year in book form: "Hospitals and children: a parent's eye view; a review of letters from parents to the Observer and the BBC".

In 1960, four young mothers from Battersea who had seen the programme met with Robertson at the Tavistock clinic. Robertson urged them to organise which resulted the establishment of "Mother Care for Children in Hospital" charity in 1961. In 1963, the organisation changed its name to National Association for the Welfare of Children in Hospital (NAWCH). During this period, Robertson campaigned across the country with his first two films.

During next few years, Robertson held a number of public meetings across the kingdom to campaign for the group.

=== Fostering ===
==== Introduction ====
The Robertson’s went on to make 'a series of harrowing films that revealed the true nature and extent of distress shown by separated young children' in hospital.

They also explored the reverse situation, when a mother was hospitalised and the children thereby separated from her – themselves 'fostering children while their mothers were in hospital' and so demonstrating that 'planning for the situation and arranging proper care can make a difference'. The Robertsons found of the fostered children that, 'in varying degree, reflecting their different levels of object constancy and ego maturity, all made a relationship to the substitute mother...The relationship with the foster-mother gave comfort and an emotional anchor which prevented them from deteriorating and held them safely until they were reunited with the mother'.

==== Grief during separation ====
In the late 1950s, Robertson and Bowlby began to disagree on the factors involved in separating children from their parents. Little is known about these disagreements and indeed Bowbly took pains to ensure that Robertson was credited with his discoveries, particularly in his books. Certainly there was never any disagreement in public. However, in 1960, Bowlby published Grief and Mourning in Infancy and Early Childhood which was the point that Robertson and Bowbly's views began to diverge. This was Bowlby's third paper in his seminal series that led to the formulation of attachment theory but was his most controversial. In the paper, he made two assertions. Firstly that protest, despair and detachment were habitual responses in children who had been separated from their mother and secondly, that children could feel grief and mourn in the same manner as adults. He stated that:

acute distress is the usual response of young children (between about six months and three to four years of age) to separation from the mother, regardless of circumstances and quality of substitute care; and, by implication, that there is no distinction between the responses of these infants at different levels of development.

The second assertion questioned Freud's argument that infants don't mourn due to insufficient ego development but instead they feel separation anxiety, if an appropriate caregiver is not present. Instead, Bowlby believed that infants experience grief when "attachment behaviours" are activated when the mother is absent, but no appropriate caregiver is present.

==== Evidence against ====
When the paper was presented to the British Psychoanalytic Society, many in the profession considered it no more than generalisations without evidence and several members including Freud, Spitz and Max Schur were tasked to submit responses. Freud criticised Bowlby's approach stating:

Neither the Hampstead Nurseries nor hospitals and other residential homes have offered ideal conditions for the study of separation per se. We, as well as Dr Bowlby, used data collected under circumstances where the children had to adapt not only to the loss of the mother but also to the change from family to group life, a transition very difficult to achieve for any young child...

Freud stressed the lack of relevant data in which to draw conclusions, "we need to supplement our observations, excluding group or ward conditions". In a paper entitled Brief separations, psychologist Christoph M. Heinicke and psychiatric social worker Ilse J Westheimer, both colleagues of Bowlby at the clinic, discussed their observations, stating that their data could not determine the influence of institutional factors, including that of multiple caretakers. They speculated that:

...if it were possible to contrast a minimal care situation with one involving highly individualized care, then one might get quite different results

In a paper published in 1961 entitled Maternal deprivation: Toward an empirical and conceptual re-evaluation, the paediatrician and psychologist Leon J. Yarrow conducted a review of the research and concluded that maternal separation had never been studied under pure conditions. Yarrow believed the complicating factors were always present. In Bowlby's book, Attachment and Loss, there is a passing reference to the complexities of the institutional situation, and a disappointing emphasis on the assertion that regardless of age and conditions of care, the young child's response to separation is usually the mourning sequence initiated by acute distress:

The subjects in the various studies differ, e.g. there is a variance in age, the type of home varies, the type of hospital or clinic they visit varies, the type of care they receive and the length of time they at the away from home. In spite of different backgrounds and expectations of the observers, the findings are remarkable in one aspect. That is once a child is aged six months, they tend to respond to the event of separation from mother in certain typical ways.

Without citing the evidence regarding the influence of each class of variable, Bowlby asserts that "by far the most important variable" is the absence of the mother, and dismisses other variables as relatively unimportant.

==== Young Children in Brief Separation (1967-1976) ====
===== International collaboration =====
The Robertsons weren't the only psychoanalysts looking at the damage caused to children by institutional care. Austrian-American psychoanalyst René Spitz analysed hospitalism (a term he formulated to describe the changes to a child that has been separated from their mother for more than 5 months) in children in orphanages and made a film called "Grief: A Peril in Infancy", about motherless babies in 1947, that examined maternal deprivation during the babies first year of life. Together Spitz and the Robertsons captured the full gamut of infant reactions to separation of their mother including short-term anxiety, cortical damage and marasmus. However, there were fundamental differences in their approach. Spitz analysed the development of the ego and looked at babies as they underwent emotional and physical regression when placed in orphanages. Spitz was fascinated with the limits of physical suffering, where the babies reached a condition akin to psychosis, which lead to stark reading of the case studies. The Robertsons conducted their research within ordinary family life and their films exposed hidden patterns of behaviour, which in contrast, lead to their films being more acceptable. Anthropologist Margaret Mead summarised the situation:

Spitz’s films were rejected, in line with the original rejection of the children, while the Robertson film was reacted to as something that “might have happened to any of our own.

===== Study funding =====
In 1963, Robertson approached Bowlby on an idea for a new study, that would try to determine the influence of variables on the behaviour of healthy young children during a ten-day separation from the mother. Bowlby assigned £1000 for the new unit and in the same year, Joyce Robertson joined her husband at the Tavistock clinic as a research associate to work on the study that would be known as Young Children in Brief Separation. Joyce Robertson became a co-producer of the film series. The couple also received a £1000 cheque from the William T. Grant Foundation while on lecture tour to Yale and Harvard University. Combined, the two monies, provided the necessary funding to finance the study, with a promise by the Foundation to fund the project for the next 11 years.

===== Study scope =====
The study was designed to observe, examine and record those variables associated with separation. This included lack of substitute mothering, the effect of a strange environment and the level of development and maturity of the child in relation to the caregiver and environment, how the child coped with anxiety and the effects of the length of separation on the child. In total, 13 children young would be observed in age ranges from 17 months to 2 years and 5 months. 9 children were looked after by their own parents.

One child was to be observed over a nine-day period while staying in a residential nursery, where staff were professional and kind but could not and would not provide substitute mothering or take note and consideration of individual needs of the child and who would act as the control. Four other children were selected to be taken into a worker's home to act as a foster home where stress was eliminated and the individual needs of the child were met by one mothering person. The four children that were to be fostered were Kate, Thomas, Jane and Lucy whose mothers were going into hospital for a birth of a second child with no other family member available to care for them. The fifth child, John, whose mother was in the same situation as the other mothers, was admitted to a residential nursery. The ages of the fostered children and single residential were as follows:

Young Children in Brief Separation children
Name	Age	Days in care	Type of care	Year of visit
Kate	2 years, 5 months	27	Fostered	1967
Jane	1 year, 5 months	10	Fostered	1968
Thomas	2 years, 4 months	10	Fostered	1971
Lucy	1 year, 9 months	19	Fostered	1976
John	1 year, 5 months	9	Residential nursery	1969

The children who were selected were healthy and happily attached to their parents and had never been subject to separation before. They were allowed to become familiar with the Robertson home. Robertson found out everything she could about the children, what their diets were, what their daily routines were and what they liked and disliked. When the children moved into the workers homes, they brought along familiar things, like family photographs, photographs of their mothers and toys. Contact between the children and their family via their father who was allowed to visit on a regular basis and if possible, on a daily basis. John in contrast didn't have a comparable placement procedure, rather he was placed in the residential nursery with their normal placement procedure.

===== Variables =====
The study was to measure the variance in

- Level of development of ego maturity and object constancy
- Defensive behaviour associated with a previous parent/child relationship
- Length of separation
- Stress factors such as inadequate substitute mothering or multiple caretakes and strange environment.

===== Observations =====
====== Film No. 1: Kate, 2 Years 5 Months ======
The first film was based on Kate who was filmed in 1967. She was visited by Joyce Robertson several times starting a month before her appointment and she became quite attached to her. In the first and second weeks Kate was settled but as time wore on she became more pensive as she repeatedly asked for her parents. But for the most she was cheerful and alert. By the third week she was greatly at ease with her foster parents and her behaviour could be considered natural, although she continued to ask for her mother. Gradually though, Kate began to show signs of anxiety and by the fourth week believed her mother no longer loved her. In one episode after creating her own home using toys, she said "Throw them in the dustbin" (meaning her parents) and wanted the toys taken from the room, but cried to have them back. When she returned to her mother she resisted her parents demands and became aggressive. When her father threatened to spank her, her aggression was transferred to her aunt. When she was taken to be enrolled at school, Kate had an attack of breathlessness when she heard the word "Taken", which the Robertsons thought was a psychosomatic attack, as she was denied free expression by her parents due to her developed aggression.

====== Film No. 2: Jane, 17 Months ======
The second film was on Jane, who was filmed in 1968. Jane was an obedient and well looked after young child who had little contact outside her family. Jane was at ease when she entered the Robertsons house and in the first week entered into a warm and loving relationship with Joyce. However, she began to have an exaggerated smile and had an unnatural laughter that indicated she was anxious. By the second week Jane was warmly attached to her foster mother. When she was returned to her mother, she was provocative towards her, which was diametrically opposite of the obedient child of 10 days prior and was occasionally spanked due to her behaviour but took on her mother in a maternal role. The Robertsons believed that Jane, who was 17 months old, had trouble maintaining an image of her mother and accepting Joyce as a new person. However, Jane was very attached to Joyce, even after she was returned home to her mother and the Robertson's believed her experience of the fostering was largely positive.

====== Film No. 3: John, 17 Months: For 9 Days ======
The third film on John was filmed in a residential nursery in 1969, while his mother was having a baby. When John was left in the nursery, he was initially accepting of the change but soon became confused and bewildered by the noise and was unable to cope with the more aggressive children in the nursery. On the first day he tried to form a relationship with a nurse who dressed him but as she moves to the next child, he protests which are ineffective. Four nurses attend to him throughout the day, but his efforts to form a relationship are rebuffed. On the second day, unable to cope with the other children, he played by himself in a corner, and cries when his father leaves after the daily visiting. On the third day, he smacks his father when he told him he was leaving as he cannot leave with him. On the fourth day, Johns behaviour deteriorates when he cries all day and sucks his thumb. He eats little, often refusing any food and has an odd shambling gait, aimlessly walking about. John become more and more isolated. On the fifth day, his misery is clearly visible to the nurses who can't console him. He cried all day and one occasion smacks a nurses face. During this period he disengages from trying to form relationships with the nurses and forms a relationship with a teddy bear. On the sixth day he cried all day, was miserable and didn't move. While the nurses were concerned with his condition, the processes within the nursery preclude them from providing full-time care for any one child and he is only briefly held and consoled. When his father makes his daily visit, he tried to smack him several times. However, he briefly smiled when his father led him to the door and he went to fetch his shoes expecting to go home, but had an anguished expression on his face when his father left him. On the seventh day he still refuses food and has a dull and blank expression, while lying silently with the teddy bear. By the eighth day he was largely silent and hasn't eaten properly for several days. On the ninth, a shift rotation occurred with new staff coming into the nursery. John was inconsolable and withdrawn.When his mother appeared he aggressively threw himself about, couldn't be comforted and refused to either be held or to look at her. When he finally did look at her, it was a look she didn't recognise.

When he returned home John had a number of tantrums. By the second week these had subsided but he played quietly in his room. By the third week, his behaviour was more extreme, his tantrums had increased, he didn't eat resulting in loss of weight and slept badly. 4 weeks later his condition had improved except when Robertson returned, John was thrown off balance, refused attention or food from his parents and became aggressive towards his mother. The same behaviour occurred again, when Robertson returned 3 weeks later, behaviour which lasted 5 days.

Robertson commented on the observations:

The making of the "John" film was a very very distressing experience. We couldn't intervene any more than Joyce giving an occasional cuddle to the child. We couldn't take him over. Otherwise we'd have been thrown out the institution... This experience left John with a profound anger against his parents and a deep sense of insecurity. He feared the child would be permanently damaged by it.

====== Film No. 4: Thomas, 2 Years 4 Months ======
The fourth film was on Thomas who was filmed in 1971 During the first week Thomas was in good humour, ate well and resisted sleep, which was normal behaviour. Being older than both Lucy and Jane, he was able to remember his absent mothers face, and would spontaneously talk about his mother as well as his past life. When his father visited he was generally happy until he found out they were only temporary visits, resulting in him crying when his father left. When his father left his pen, he wouldn't let it go and complained to the Robertsons when they sat on the chair his father had been sitting on. When tired he would always ask for his parents. He was conflicted about needing affection from Joyce and loyalty to his mother, sometimes rejecting Joyce, other times speaking in a relaxed manner about his mother while needing Joyce's affection. In the second week, affection from Thomas could turn to aggression without warning. As the most mature child in the group, he could explain verbally what was making him anxious and understood the situation when it was explained to him. His father's visits became very important to him. During these periods he experienced both intense happiness before he arrived and sadness afterwards as he knew he was leaving. By the ninth day, his anxiety was becoming more and more visible, as he became more impatient and aggressive. When he finally met his mother after the separation, his response was gentle and kind. When he returned home he was less easy to control and was more aggressive. The Robertsons considered Thomas's condition to be one of "manageable anxiety" that the child could cope with and work through.

====== Film No.5: Lucy, 21 Months ======
The fifth film was on Lucy who was filmed in 1976 Lucy was a rather glum little girl who the Robertsons believed had suffered cathexis from her mother. Lucy didnt talk much, dribbled and slept a lot. During the first week with her foster mother, she slept better, ate properly and was brighter and more responsive. She cried after her father visted but was affectionate towards her foster mother. In the second week, she became cross and would often isolate herself, had less time with her father, although still friendly during visits, but would be affectionate with her foster mother. In the third week, after her father took her to the park, she would be negative and defiant but after some time she would receive comforting from Joyce and be clingy. When her mother returned, she piled her toys on her lap and climbed on, but returned for a hug from her foster mother. After reunion, Lucy and her mother maintained many of the improvements i.e. habits that had been made in the Robertsons home. However, Lucy had difficulty in leaving Joyce and several visits had to be made to enable Lucy to decathect from her foster mum.

===== Findings =====
The findings from the project which ran from 1965 to 1976 were contrary to much of the published literature. Separation per se did not cause acute stress and despair, but rather anxiety, which could be kept to a minimum allowing development to continue. Data indicated that 1 1/2-year-olds make a complete transfer to the caretaker, while 2 1/2-year-olds are more ambivalent. The institutionalised child displayed evidence of trauma and cumulative stresses after six years. Their 1971 paper Young Children in Brief Separation, A Fresh Look was also published in the journal, The Psychoanalytic Study of the Child. In the summary section, the Robertsons concluded that Bowlby had overgeneralised James Robertson's earlier findings about how children respond in institutional settings. They concluded by stating:

Our findings do not support Bowlby's generalisations about the responses of young children to separation from the mother per se, nor do they support his theory on grief and mourning in infancy and early childhood. ... but we continue to share his concern about the potential harm associated with early separation from the mother.

===== Bonding and attachment =====
The Robertsons believed that no matter how good the substitute mother, separation of the child from the mother remains a hazard for a young child due to the discontinuity of the mother-child relationship. Each of the four children were able to bond with Joyce, and after the separation, were able to reform that bond with their mother. For the Robertsons, '"bonding" refers to the feelings parents have for their children and "attachment" to the feelings children have for their parents...they run in parallel'. They distinguished the two on the grounds that 'Bonding is a mature form of loving. But the attachment of child to parent is an immature form of loving – unstable in the early months and years'. They considered that 'bonding progresses down the generations to promote the well-being of each new batch of babies...where the parents are not bonded to the children, the children are put at risk'. The Robertsons were convinced that if a substitute mother is provided, the child will reach out and bond with the substitute mother, entering into a relationship that will reduce the stress suffered by the child. They suggested that regular contract with a parent, along with reminders such a photographs of their mother would help the child cope with separation. They also suggested that when a child was placed in an unfamiliar environment, the maintenance of familiar home routines would remind them of their home and family, lessening separation anxiety.

===== Reviews =====
In 1969, Anna Freud reviewed the Robertsons film, "John, Seventeen Months: Nine Days in a Residential Nursery". Freud opens the review by stating the film is the best medium in direct observation. The reviews covers the examination of the simple motives of the parents placing the young toddler John in a residential nursery through to the pressures he experienced during the 9 days he in was there. Freud describes how he was physically unprepared for the rough and tumble play of the other children. However its his parents absence that effects him the most. The absence from his mother over the 9 days except for periodic visits, has shattered his personality and affected his long term mental development. Freud uses Ernst Kris's concept of "regression rate" to describe how John degrades from a bright child who takes part in constructive play to a whining child who wander aimlessly about and is beyond parental affection. However, his experience can't be described as trauma. Instead John suffers from a "strain-trauma'", defined by Kris in 1956 and now known as development trauma. He is left severely traumatised. He is described as a "bonny and attractive child" by Joyce who is well adjusted when he enters the nursey but who becomes withdrawn, apathetic and listless in one hand and aggressive and wild and animal like on another. Freud compares his attachment to a large teddy bear is reflected in the behaviour of monkeys holding the "cloth mother" observed during American psychologist Harry Harlow monkey behaviour studies.

In January 1976, British social workers Timothy Beardsworth and Olive Stevenson comprehensively reviewed the five films for the The British Journal of Social Work. After establishing the initial context of the project, Stevenson contrasts the project variables from a positivist view to a naturalist viewpoint. Stevenson describes how the couple would have needed 25 children to determine scientific proof along with several control children i.e. several "Johns" and even the results wouldn't have been statistically significant. A second crucial variable had been missed - the constitutional differences between individual children and to arrive at a metric, twins would have needed to measure the response of separation, one in a residential nursery and one in the foster home. Stevenson discusses a third variable that was missed, the response of the mother and how she reacted during reunion and the behaviour of both parties with the arrival of a new baby. Stevenson then posits that the couple are naturalists, essentially observers, so its not a case that they are not being scientific or unscientific and its their observations that make the films such an invaluable teaching aid. However it would be wrong to say their observations make them ethologists, they are human adults watching human children and trying to discern the inner feelings of the children. Stevenson describes how the films enable the viewer to discern those feelings and posits that case histories of the type initially formulated by Anna Freud and Dorothy Burlingham and who trained Robertson in the same technique, are better at conveying suffering than the dry texts of Bowlby and e.g. Michael Rutter. She describes several passages in several of Robertsons observations and how the vivid accounts in the films make the viewer feel what it would be like to mourn the absence of the mother. In last two pages , Stevenson describes how the films and observations can be used within the social work profession and how and why they have engendered a feeling of depression, due to an anxiety that child abuse is occurring. This is followed by a description of the common operational practices associated with the profession that can benefit from Robertsons work.

Other reviewers included Irma Elkan who reviewed the film with John for the Journal of Child Psychotherapy in 1967, Shirley Hoxter who reviewed the Kate and Jane films for the Journal of Child Psychotherapy in 1968 and A.E. Mason, who reviewed the films of Kate, Janes and John for the American Journal of Orthopsychiatry in 1970. In 1976, Hansi Kennedy reviewed the 5 films for the The International Journal of Psychoanalysis.

=== Film – Nursery School for the Blind ===
Robertson didn't only create documentaries for research at the Tavistock Clinic, he also collaborated with the Hampstead Child Therapy Clinic. The first of these documentaries "Nursery School for the Blind" was produced in 1967 in collaboration with Dorothy Burlingham, who ran the study group on blind children at the Hampstead clinic. The film was reviewed in 1968 where it was described as successfully delivering an examination of innovations that could help small children who were blind to become independent.

=== Young Children in Hospital ===
In 1970, Robertson released a second edition of the companion thesis to "Young Children in Hospital", that he updated with a postscript where he described the outcome of the Platt report and how the report failed to take cognisance of the needs of young children. He then describes the level of informed public opinion who are looking for change and calls on the government to create a commission to full investigate and appraise the needs of children. Robertson also examines the problems of children in long-stay hospitals. The book was reviewed by British Journal of Surgery who stated "This book should be compulsory reading for all doctors and nurses who have to deal with children.

=== Robertson Centre ===
In 1975 Robertson left the Tavistock Clinic and together with his wife, Freud, Burlingham, paediatrician and psychiatrist Mary Lindsay, MacCarthy and Beatrice Serota, they opened the Robertson Centre. Its purpose was to advance public understanding of the emotional needs of very young children. The group held seminars and spoke at conferences across Britain, Europe, the United States and Canada.

==== Expert witnesses ====
In the same year, the couple were called as expert witnesses in a high court case involving case that came after the formulation of the Children Act 1975, when they argued against a local authority who wished to remove a small child, who had been fostered to the same family for more than 3 years, i.e. since she was a baby. The Robertsons used the concept of the "psychological parent" from "Beyond the Best Interest of the Child" by Joseph Goldstein, Anna Freud and Albert J. Solnit to argue their case and won it. The Robertsons formalised their evidence into a paper "The Psychological Parent" that was published in 1977. They examined and compared the effects of the child coping with attachment and bonding with the blood mother, adoptive mother and foster mother. They examined the case of 6-year old Maria Colwell, who had been fostered as a young child and then returned to her parent and then killed by her stepfather. The Robertsons in examining the case were horrified at the plight of the young child and recommended that more research in early-relationship development was needed.

==== Separation and the Very Young ====
In 1989, Joyce and James Robertson released "Separation and the Very Young", a small volume contains a chronological history of the Robertsons work during the previous 40 years, as well as several new papers that are salient to the subject. The book was written in the last years of Robertsons life and was only finished 3 weeks before his death.

== Publications ==
Books and journals

- Robertson, James (May 1959). "Going to Hospital with Mother. A Documentary Film". Proceedings of the Royal Society of Medicine. 52 (5): 381–384. doi:10.1177/003591575905200518. PMC 1869195. PMID 13658166.
- Robertson, James, ed. (1962). Hospitals and children: a parent's eye view; a review of letters from parents to the Observer and the BBC. New York: International Universities Press. OCLC 633726.
- Robertson, James; Robertson, Joyce (January 1971). "Young Children in Brief Separation: A Fresh Look". The Psychoanalytic Study of the Child. 26 (1): 264–315. doi:10.1080/00797308.1971.11822274. OCLC 217389912. PMID 5163230.
- Bowlby, J.; Robertson, James; Rosenbluth, Dima (1952). "A Two-Year-Old Goes to Hospital". Psychoanalytic Study of the Child. 7: 82–94. doi:10.1080/00797308.1952.11823154.
- Robertson, James (1960). On the Making of Two Medical Health Films. London: International Catalogue of Medical Health Films. (Also printed as "Nothing But the Truth", Film User magazine, volume 14)
- Robertson, James (1962). Hospitals and children, a parent's-eye view; a review of letters from parents to the Observer and the BBC. London: Gollancz. OCLC 14600892.
- Robertson, James; Robertson, Joyce (January 1971). "Young Children in Brief Separation: A Fresh Look". The Psychoanalytic Study of the Child. 26 (1): 264–315. doi:10.1080/00797308.1971.11822274. PMID 5163230.
- Robertson, James (1970). Young children in hospital (2nd edition (with postscript) ed.). London: Tavistock Publications. ISBN 978-0-422-75060-8. OCLC 1323030653.
- Robertson, James; Robertson, Joyce (April 1977). "The Psychological Parent". Adoption & Fostering. 87 (1): 19–22. doi:10.1177/030857597708700106.
- Robertson, James; Robertson, Joyce (1982). A Baby in the Family: Loving and Being Loved. London: Penguin. ISBN 978-0140464993.
- Robertson, James; Robertson, Joyce (1989). Separation and the very young (1st ed.). London: Free Association Books. ISBN 9781853430978. OCLC 21212582.

Films

- Robertson, James (1952). A Two-Year-Old Goes to Hospital (16mm, b &w, Film, 45 mins, 30 mins, sound) (in English and French). New York: New York University Film Library: Tavistock Child Development Research Unit.
- Robertson, James (1958). Going to Hospital with Mother (16mm, b &w, Film, 45 mins, 40 mins, sound) (in English and French). New York: New York University Film Library: Tavistock Child Development Research Unit.
- Robertson, James (1967). Young Children in Brief Separation, Film No. I: Kate, 2 Years 5 Months: In Foster Care for 27 Days (16mm, b &w, Film, 33 mins, Guide booklet sound) (in English and French). New York: New York University Film Library: Tavistock Child Development Research Unit.
- Robertson, James (1968). Young Children in Brief Separation, Film No.2: Jane, 17 Months: In Foster Care for 10 Days (16mm, b &w, Film, 37 mins, Guide booklet sound) (in English and French). New York: New York University Film Library: Tavistock Child Development Research Unit.
- Robertson, James (1969). Young Children in Brief Separation, Film No. 3: John, 17 Months: For 9 Days in a Residential Nursery (16mm, b &w, Film, 45 mins, Guide booklet sound) (in English and French). New York: New York University Film Library: Tavistock Child Development Research Unit.
- Robertson, James (1971). Young Children in Brief Separation, Film No. 4: Thomas, 2 Years 4 Months: In Foster Care for 10 Days (16mm, b &w, Film, 38 mins, Guide booklet sound) (in English and French). New York: New York University Film Library: Tavistock Child Development Research Unit.
- Robertson, James (1971). Young Children in Brief Separation, Film No.5: Lucy, 21 Months: In Foster Care for 19 Days (16mm, b &w, Film, 31 mins, Guide booklet sound) (in English and French). New York: New York University Film Library: Tavistock Child Development Research Unit.

== Awards and honours ==
In 2003, Robertson and his wife Joyce were awarded the Bowlby-Ainsworth Award for Documenting And Improving The Lives Of Young Children In Difficult Circumstances.

== See also ==
- Attachment theory
- Platt Report 1959 British government report that made wide ranging recommendations based upon the principle that children needed their parents.
- Jenny Aubry
- René Spitz, an Austrian-American psychoanalyst, who is best known for his analysis of hospitalized infants in which he found links between marasmus and death with unmothered infants. He also made significant contributions to the school of ego psychology.

== Bibliography ==
- Alsop-Shields, Linda; Mohay, Heather (July 2001). "John Bowlby and James Robertson: theorists, scientists and crusaders for improvements in the care of children in hospital". Journal of Advanced Nursing. 35 (1): 50–58. doi:10.1046/j.1365-2648.2001.01821.x. PMID 11442682.
- Beardsworth, Timothy; Stevenson, Olive (1976). "The Effect on a Young Child of Brief Separation from his Mother: Five Films by the Robertsons". The British Journal of Social Work. 6 (3): 393–401. doi:10.1093/oxfordjournals.bjsw.a056741. ISSN 0045-3102. JSTOR 23693942.
- Bilson, A.; Humphreys, N.; Meadows, C. (15 June 2000). Essential Reports in Paediatrics. CRC Press. ISBN 978-1-85996-168-1.
- Boothe, Helvi (January 1954). "The International Seminar on Mental Health and Infant Development, Chichester, 1952". American Journal of Orthopsychiatry. 24 (1): 1–7. doi:10.1111/j.1939-0025.1954.tb01992.x. PMID 13148298.
- Bowlby, John (10 February 2017). "Grief and Mourning in Infancy and Early Childhood". The Psychoanalytic Study of the Child. 15 (1): 9–52. doi:10.1080/00797308.1960.11822566.
- Bowlby, J.; Robertson, James; Rosenbluth, Dima (1952). "A Two-Year-Old Goes to Hospital". Psychoanalytic Study of the Child. 7: 82–94. doi:10.1080/00797308.1952.11823154.
- Bowlby, John; Robertson, James (June 1953). "A Two-Year-Old Goes to Hospital". Proceedings of the Royal Society of Medicine. 46 (6): 425–427. doi:10.1177/003591575304600603. PMC 1918555. PMID 13074181.
- Bowlby, John (1969). Attachment and loss. In three volumes. New York: Basic Books. ISBN 978-0-465-09716-6. OCLC 561135235.
- Boston, Mary (April 1989). "James Robertson 1911–1988". Journal of Child Psychotherapy. 15 (2): 5–8. doi:10.1080/00754178908254840.
- Brandon, S.; Lindsay, M.; Lovell-Davis, J.; Kraemer, S. (1 March 2009). ""What is wrong with emotional upset?" - 50 years on from the Platt Report". Archives of Disease in Childhood. 94 (3): 173–177. doi:10.1136/adc.2008.152512. PMID 19234036.
- Bower, Marion (1995). "Early applications". In Trowell, Judith; Bower, Marion (eds.). The emotional needs of young children and their families: using psychoanalytic ideas in the community. London; New York: Routledge. p. 38. ISBN 0415116120.
- Brain, Christine; Mukherji, Penny (2005). Understanding child psychology. Cheltenham: Nelson Thornes. ISBN 9780748790845.
- Bretherton, Inge (September 1992). "The origins of attachment theory: John Bowlby and Mary Ainsworth". Developmental Psychology. 28 (5): 759–775. doi:10.1037/0012-1649.28.5.759.
- Burland, J. Alexis (1992). "Separation and the Very Young: By James and Joyce Robertson. London: Free Association Books, 1989. 242 pp". The Psychoanalytic Quarterly. 61: 461–463.
- Davies, Ruth (5 January 2010). "Marking the 50th anniversary of the Platt Report: from exclusion, to toleration and parental participation in the care of the hospitalized child". Journal of Child Health Care. 14 (1): 6–23. doi:10.1177/1367493509347058. PMID 20051502. S2CID 206719396.
- Dibden, W.A. (26 September 1956). "A two-year-old goes to hospital: a scientific film and lecture". Australian Journal of Physiotherapy. 2 (2). Adelaide: 94–99. doi:10.1016/S0004-9514(14)60922-3.
- O'Connel, Dorothy; Terril, Marilyn; Brash-Sorenson, Charlene (March 1975). Research Relating to Children - Bulletin 34. Clearinghouse for Research in Child Life, University of Illinois.
- Dorothy; Marilyn; Charlene (March 1975). Research Relating to Children - Bulletin 35. Clearinghouse for Research in Child Life.
- Duschinsky, Robbie (2020). "John Bowlby and the Tavistock Separation Research Unit". Cornerstones of attachment research. Oxford: Oxford University Press. pp. 1–108. doi:10.1093/med-psych/9780198842064.003.0001. ISBN 9780198842064.
- Ezquerro, Arturo (2016). Encounters with John Bowlby: Tales of Attachment. Florence: Taylor and Francis. ISBN 9781134813001.
- Eiser, Christine (27 September 1990). Chronic Childhood Disease: An Introduction to Psychological Theory and Research. Cambridge University Press. pp. 14–. ISBN 978-0-521-38682-1.
- Elkan, Irma (December 1967). "James and Joyce Robertson: Young Children in Brief Separation. No. 3 : John, aged 17 months, For Nine Days in a Residential Nursery. Data : 16mm, Sound, 45 minutes. Available from (a) Concord Films Council, Nacton, Ipswich, Suffolk, (b) New York University Film Library". Journal of Child Psychotherapy. 2 (3): 82–84. doi:10.1080/00754176908259418.
- Freud, Anna (1953). "A Two-Year-Old Goes to Hospital—Scientific Film by James Robertson (part III)". International Journal of Psychoanalysis. 34: 284–287.
- Freud, Anna (January 1960). "Discussion of Dr. John bowlby's Paper". The Psychoanalytic Study of the Child. 15 (1): 53–62. doi:10.1080/00797308.1960.11822567. PMID 13701801.
- Gillman, Arthur E. (July 1968). "Review of Nursery school for the blind". American Journal of Orthopsychiatry. 38 (4): 765–766. doi:10.1037/h0097162.
- Harrington, Richard (August 1990). "Separation and the Very Young. By James and Joyce Robertson. London: Free Association Books. 1989. 256 pp. £12.95 (pb), £25.00 (hb)". British Journal of Psychiatry. 157 (2): 312. doi:10.1192/S000712500006284X.
- Heinicke, Christoph M; Westheimer, Ilse J; Wolpert, Elizabeth (1965). Brief separations. New York: International Universities Press. OCLC 566118864.
- van der Horst, Frank C.P.; van der Veer, René (March 2009). "Changing attitudes towards the care of children in hospital: a new assessment of the influence of the work of Bowlby and Robertson in the UK, 1940–1970". Attachment & Human Development. 11 (2): 119–142. doi:10.1080/14616730802503655. PMID 19266362.
- Joice, Katie (August 2022). "Narrating the Infant: A New Look at the Films of James and Joyce Robertson". Psychoanalysis and History. 24 (2): 127–150. doi:10.3366/pah.2022.0421.
- Hoxter, Shirley (1968). "James and Joyce Robertson: Young Children in Brief Separation. No. 1: Kate, aged 2 years, 5 months, in foster-care for 27 days. Guide booklet. No. 2: Jane, aged 17 months, in foster-care for 10 days. Guide booklet. Tavistock Child Development Research Unit, London. 1968. New York University Film Library, New York". Journal of Child Psychotherapy. 2 (2): 80–81.
- Johns, Jennifer (11 June 2018). "Robertson, James (1911-1988)". Encyclopedia. Gale. Archived from the original on 20 September 2026.
- Johns, Jennifer (2005). De Mijolla, Alain (ed.). International dictionary of psychoanalysis. Vol. 3 (10th ed.). London: Thomson Gale. p. 1509. ISBN 0028659945.
- Karen, Robert (1998). Becoming Attached: First Relationships and how They Shape Our Capacity to Love. Oxford University Press. ISBN 978-0-19-511501-7.
- Kennedy, Hansi (1976). "Young Children in Brief Separation—A Critical Review of Five Films by James Robertson and Joyce Robertson". The International Journal of Psychoanalysis. 57: 483–486.
- Knight, Rona; Miller, Jill M. (31 December 2024). "Developmental Trauma: An Introduction to the Section". The Psychoanalytic Study of the Child. 77 (1): 18–25. doi:10.1080/00797308.2024.2305592.
- Klaus, Marshall H.; Kennell, John H. (1982). Parent-infant bonding (2nd ed.). St. Louis: Mosby. pp. 113–115. ISBN 0801626862.
- Little, Rod A; Frayn, Keith N. (1986). The Scientific Basis for the Care of the Critically ill. Manchester University Press. p. 12. ISBN 978-0-7190-1769-8.
- Linda, Pound (2011). Influencing Early Childhood Education: Key Figures, Philosophies and Ideas. McGraw-Hill Education (UK). ISBN 978-0-335-24156-9.
- Lindsay, Mary (November 2009). "Comments on the article Changing attitudes towards the care of children in hospital: a new assessment of the influence of the work of Bowlby and Robertson in the UK, 1940–1970 by Frank C.P. van der Horst and Rene van der Veer (Attachment and Human Development Vol 11, No 2, March 2009, 119–142)". Attachment & Human Development. 11 (6): 563–567. doi:10.1080/14616730903282506. PMID 20183557.
- Lindsay, Mary (19 May 2013). "Joyce Robertson obituary". Guardian News & Media Limited. The Guardian.
- Lindsay, Mary. "Sick Children and their Parents" (PDF). Centre for Social Policy. Buckfastleigh, Devon: Centre for Social Policy 2026. Archived from the original (PDF) on 25 March 2026.
- Lindsay, Bruce (March 2003). "'A 2-Year-Old Goes to Hospital': A 50th Anniversary Reappraisal of the Impact of James Robertson's Film". Journal of Child Health Care. 7 (1): 17–26. doi:10.1177/1367493503007001672. PMID 12665338.
- Lindsay, Mary (March 2023). "Dermod MacCarthy: a paediatric pioneer". Archives of Disease in Childhood. 108 (3): 240–241. doi:10.1136/archdischild-2022-324595. PMID 36253070.
- Mason, Edward A. (April 1970). "Review of Young children in brief separation: Kate; Young children in brief separation: Jane; and Young children in brief separation: John". American Journal of Orthopsychiatry. 40 (3): 546–548. doi:10.1037/h0097595.
- Monroe Davies, H.G. (18 March 1949). "Letters to the Editor - Visits to Children in Hospital". The Spectator. Westminster, London: The Spectator Archive: 18.
- Malberg, Norka T.; Raphael-Leff, Joan (1 January 2012). The Anna Freud Tradition: Lines of Development - Evolution and Theory and Practice Over the Decades. Karnac Books. ISBN 978-1-78049-021-2.
- Midgley, Nick (1 August 2007). "Anna Freud: The Hampstead War Nurseries and the role of the direct observation of children for psychoanalysis". International Journal of Psychoanalysis. 88 (4): 939–959. doi:10.1516/ijpa.2007.939. PMID 17681901.
- Maccarthy, Dermod; Lindsay, Mary; Morris, I. (March 1962). "Children in Hospital with Mothers". The Lancet. 279 (7230): 603–608. doi:10.1016/S0140-6736(62)91598-2. PMID 14467755.
- Robertson, James (1952). A Two-Year-Old Goes to Hospital (16mm, b &w, Film, 45 mins, 30 mins, sound) (in English and French). New York: New York University Film Library: Tavistock Child Development Research Unit.
- Robertson, James (April 1953a). "Some responses of young children to the loss of maternal care". Nursing Times: 382–386.
- Robertson, James (1953b). A Two-Year-Old Goes to Hospital: A Guide to the Film. London: Tavistock Publications. OCLC 1026422181.
- Robertson, James (September 1955). "Young children in long-term hospitals". Nursing Times. 23: 63–65.
- Robertson, Joyce; Freud, Anna (10 February 2017) [1956]. "A Mother's Observations on the Tonsillectomy of Her Four-Year-Old Daughter". The Psychoanalytic Study of the Child. 11 (1): 410–427. doi:10.1080/00797308.1956.11822796.
- Robertson, James (1958a). Going to Hospital with Mother (16mm, b &w, Film, 45 mins, 40 mins, sound) (in English and French). New York: New York University Film Library: Tavistock Child Development Research Unit.
- Robertson, James (1958b). Young Children in Hospital. London: Tavistock Publications.
- Robertson, James (May 1959). "Going to Hospital with Mother. A Documentary Film". Proceedings of the Royal Society of Medicine. 52 (5): 381–384. doi:10.1177/003591575905200518. PMC 1869195. PMID 13658166.
- Robertson, James; Burlingham, Dorothy (June 1967). Nursery school for the blind (16mm, b &w, Film 20-minute, guide booklet, sound). New York: New York University Film Library: Hampstead Child Therapy Clinic.
- Robertson, James (1967). Young Children in Brief Separation, Film No. I: Kate, 2 Years 5 Months: In Foster Care for 27 Days (16mm, b &w, Film, 33 mins, Guide booklet sound) (in English and French). New York: New York University Film Library: Tavistock Child Development Research Unit.
- Robertson, James (1968). Young Children in Brief Separation, Film No.2: Jane, 17 Months: In Foster Care for 10 Days (16mm, b &w, Film, 37 mins, Guide booklet sound) (in English and French). New York: New York University Film Library: Tavistock Child Development Research Unit.
- Robertson, James (1969). Young Children in Brief Separation, Film No. 3: John, 17 Months: For 9 Days in a Residential Nursery (16mm, b &w, Film, 45 mins, Guide booklet sound) (in English and French). New York: New York University Film Library: Tavistock Child Development Research Unit.
- Robertson, James; Robertson, Joyce; Freud, Anna (January 1969). "Film Review: John, Seventeen Months: Nine Days in a Residential Nursery". The Psychoanalytic Study of the Child. 24 (1): 138–143. doi:10.1080/00797308.1969.11822689.
- Robertson, James (1971). Young Children in Brief Separation, Film No. 4: Thomas, 2 Years 4 Months: In Foster Care for 10 Days (16mm, b &w, Film, 38 mins, Guide booklet sound) (in English and French). New York: New York University Film Library: Tavistock Child Development Research Unit.
- Robertson, James (1976). Young Children in Brief Separation, Film No.5: Lucy, 21 Months: In Foster Care for 19 Days (16mm, b &w, Film, 31 mins, Guide booklet sound) (in English and French). New York: New York University Film Library: Tavistock Child Development Research Unit.
- Robertson, James (1970). Young children in hospital (2nd edition (with postscript) ed.). London: Tavistock Publications. ISBN 978-0-422-75060-8. OCLC 1323030653.
- "Review:Young children in hospital. By James Robertson. Tavistock Institute of Human Relations, London. Second Edition. 7¾ × 5 in. Pp. 155 + xv. 1970. London: Tavistock Publications Ltd. 80p (16s.)". Journal of British Surgery. 58 (3): 244. 1 March 1971. doi:10.1002/bjs.1800580342.
- Robertson, James; Robertson, Joyce (January 1971). "Young Children in Brief Separation: A Fresh Look". The Psychoanalytic Study of the Child. 26 (1): 264–315. doi:10.1080/00797308.1971.11822274. PMID 5163230.
- "'Young Children in Brief Separation' by James and Joyce Robertson (Review)". The Therapeutic Care Journal. 1 October 2009. Archived from the original on 18 September 2026.
- Hospitals and children, a parent's-eye view; a review of letters from parents to the Observer and the BBC. London: Gollancz. 1982. OCLC 14600892.
- Robertson, James; Bowlby, John (1952). "Responses of young children to separation from their mothers II: observations of the sequences of response of children aged 18 to 24 months during the course of separation". Courrier du Centre International de l'Enfance. 2: 131–142.
- Robertson, James; Robertson, Joyce (1989). Separation and the very young (1st ed.). London: Free Association Books. ISBN 9781853430978. OCLC 21212582.
- Robertson, James (1962). Hospitals and children: a parent's eye view; a review of letters from parents to the Observer and the BBC. New York: International Universities Press.
- Robertson, James; Robertson, Joyce (April 1977). "The Psychological Parent". Adoption & Fostering. 87 (1): 19–22. doi:10.1177/030857597708700106.
- Robertson, James (28 January 1983). "Anna Freud and the Robertsons". Robertson Films. Archived from the original on 14 May 2025.
- Robertson, Joyce; McGilly, Katherine (November 2009). "Comments on "Changing attitudes towards the care of children in hospital: a new assessment of the influence of the work of Bowlby and Robertson in the UK, 1940–1970" by Frank C.P. van der Horst and Rene van der Veer (Attachment & Human Development Vol 11, No 2, March 2009, 119–142)". Attachment & Human Development. 11 (6): 557–561. doi:10.1080/14616730903282514. PMID 20183556.
- Rowold, Katharina (November 2019). "What Do Babies Need to Thrive? Changing Interpretations of 'Hospitalism' in an International Context, 1900-1945". Social History of Medicine: The Journal of the Society for the Social History of Medicine. 32 (4): 799–818. doi:10.1093/shm/hkx114. PMC 6913704. PMID 31857744.
- Shapira, Michal (2013). The war inside: psychoanalysis, total war, and the making of the democratic self in postwar Britain. Cambridge: Cambridge University Press. ISBN 9781107519237. OCLC 1277063424.
- Skynner, Robin; Cleese, John (1997). Families and how to survive them. London: Vermilion. ISBN 9780749314101. OCLC 859022449.
- "Joyce Robertson". Times Newspapers Limited. The Times. 3 June 2013.
- Van der Horst, Frank C. P.; Van der Veer, René (June 2009). "Separation and divergence: The untold story of James Robertson's and John Bowlby's theoretical dispute on mother–child separation". Journal of the History of the Behavioral Sciences. 45 (3): 236–252. doi:10.1002/jhbs.20380. PMID 19575387.
- Van der Horst, Frank C. P. (2011). John Bowlby: from psychoanalysis to ethology: unravelling the roots of attachment theory. Hoboken, N.J: Wiley. ISBN 978-0-470-68364-4.
- Walker, Jan; Payne, Sheila; Jarrett, Nikki; Smith, Paolo (2007). Psychology for nurses and the caring professions. Maidenhead, Berkshire: Open University Press. ISBN 9780335230334.
- Winnicott, Donald W. (October 2016). "Review: Going to Hospital with Mother: A Film by James Robertson". The Collected Works of D. W. Winnicott: 529–532. doi:10.1093/med:psych/9780190271374.003.0120.
- Walker, Eric; Vulliamy, Lydia. "James and Joyce Robertson case study" (PDF). Concord Media. Ipswich, Suffolk.
- Wenger, Marjorie, ed. (18 April 1953). "A two-year-old goes to hospital'". Journal of the Royal College of Nursing - Nursing Times. London: Macmillan & Co Ltd: 389–384.
- Wolman, Benjamin B. (2012). Contemporary Theories and Systems in Psychology. New York: Plenum Press. p. 327. ISBN 9781468438024.
- Winnicott, Donald W. (1973) [1951]. "Visiting Children in Hospital". The child, the family, and the outside world (Reprint ed.). Harmondsworth: Penguin Books. ISBN 9780140206685. OCLC 500439932.
- Yarrow, Leon J. (1961). "Maternal deprivation: Toward an empirical and conceptual re-evaluation". Psychological Bulletin. 58 (6): 459–490. doi:10.1037/h0043656. PMID 14009020.
