= Joyce Robertson =

British psychiatric social worker (1919–2013)

- Joyce Robertson
- Born: 27 March 1919; London, England
- Died: 12 April 2013 (aged 94)
- Citizenship: English
- Known for: Child behavioural researcher, childcare pioneer
- Spouse: James Robertson
- Awards: Bowlby-Ainsworth Award 2003
- Scientific career
- Fields: Psychiatry, social work
- Workplaces: Hampstead Child Therapy Clinic, Tavistock Clinic

Joyce Robertson (27 March 1919 – 12 April 2013) was a British psychiatric social worker, child behavioural researcher, childcare pioneer and pacifist, who was most notable for changing attitudes to the societally acceptable, institutionalised care and hospitalisation of young children, that was prevalent. In the late 1940s Robertson worked with Anna Freud first at the Well Baby Clinic, a department of the Hampstead Child Therapy Clinic. She was later joined by her husband James Robertson. In 1965, both of them moved to the Tavistock Institute of Human Relations to work with John Bowlby on the Young Children in Brief Separation project and the development of attachment theory. This was to research the mental state and psychological development of children who underwent brief separation from their parents. Later in her career, Robertson worked with her husband to produce a series of celebrated documentary films that highlighted the reaction of small children who were separated from their parents. These were shown in hospitals, foster care and state run hospitals. Later she was known for promoting the idea of foster care instead of residential nurseries.

== Personal life ==
Robertson (nee User) came from a large working-class family in London. Robertson left Grammar school in 1933 when she was 14 and enrolled for evening classes at the Workers' Educational Association. In 1939, Joyce met her future husband James Robertson in Birmingham while he was studying the humanities at the Fircroft College of Adult Education and she was studying at the Hillcroft College for working women. During World War II, Joyce and James were conscientious objectors, and during the late 1940's both worked at the Pacifist Service Unit in East London with the victims of the bombing.

Joyce had two daughters, Katherine McGilly (born in 1944) and Jean Clelland (born in 1950). She had two grandchildren and three great grandchildren.

== Career ==
In January 1941, while she was a student, Robertson went to work with Anna Freud and Dorothy Burlingham in Hampstead Wartime Nurseries to look after infants. At the time, Freud and Burlingham were offering shelter to women with families who had been bombed. Knowing that Robertson came from a large family, and as she was the only Briton in the war nurseries, Freud employed her and asked her to research the different methods of childcare, determine what types of practice were in use and write detailed observations on index cards. A few weeks later, James Robertson was employed by Freud as a boilerman, fire watcher and handyman. At that time, James Robertson was courting Joyce Robertson and it was through her that James met Freud.

Freud asked Robertson to care for a baby named Josef, observing Robertson in the mother-child relationship and then discussing the care relationship with her. Freud found that Robertson's hearty nature enabled her to connect with the small baby who responded to the care. Freud then asked Robertson to care for a little boy who was five months old. Over months, Robertson formed a strong attachment to the boy and would take him on walks. These observations of the mother-child relationship and resultant discussions was the start of attachment research that would eventually lead to Attachment theory. Robertson remembered kneeling on the floor with Freud while they reviewed the observation notes that would form the basis of a publication by Robertson and her husband entitled "Reactions of small children to short-term separation of the mother, in light of new observations".

Robertson took time off for the birth of her first daughter in 1944. In 1945, she had to take her 13-month old baby into hospital for treatment. She was devastated to discover she was not able to visit her child, although she knew that the baby needed her. At that time, the rule was no mothers, with hospital visits commonly limited to 30 minutes per week. This experience sparked Robertson's interest in the field of childcare.

She didn't return to work with Freud until 1957, when her second daughter started primary school. She worked initially in the Well Baby Clinic. At the clinic, she started the first parent-toddler group. Robertson understood that the parents would need help in understanding their infant's new development stage, once they moved out of the clinic. Later she moved to the kindergarten of the Hampstead Child Therapy Clinic. In 1948, her husband James Robertson joined the Tavistock Clinic to make observations of the behaviour of small children.

In 1952, her husband James made the film A Two-Year-Old Goes to Hospital and published a paper with John Bowlby. Robertson and Bowlby were planning to abandon the documentary since the child being studied (Laura) did not cry very much. She had been in hospital for eight days, admitted for a hernia operation. In the film the mother is seen leaving the child, assured by the nurse that she would settle down when she leaves. When the mother does leave, Laura reacts violently and her mood changes for the worst. By the end of the stay it appears that Laura is withdrawn and depressed. When her husband and Bowlby showed her the film, it was Joyce who made the critical breakthrough in realising why Laura was not crying, being a desperate attempt by the tiny girl to control her feelings. The film had an enormous impact and it was agreed that mothers should be able to spend the night with their children in hospital.

== Early case study ==
In 1954, Robertson's second daughter, Jean, who at the time was four years old, required a tonsillectomy. Robertson kept a diary of the event, which resulted in a paper entitled A Mother's Observations on the Tonsillectomy of Her Four-Year-Old Daughter. The paper was published in 1956 in the journal The Psychoanalytic Study of the Child and had several pages of comments by Anna Freud. Robertson began the diary six weeks before the visit to the hospital with daily entries that continued until three weeks after the operation, with addenda in the 11th and 20th weeks.

In summarising the paper, Robertson concluded that her presence and responsiveness to questions enabled Jean to cope with the fear of hospitalisation. The reassuring words and presence of her mother enabled Jean to retain trust in Joyce and enabled her to go home happy. However, the entries in the diary indicate that even for a three-day hospitalisation and operation that was both successful and remarkably common from a medical perspective, it filled Jean's life for six months.

== Foster care ==
=== Introduction ===
In the early 1960s, her husband James and John Bowlby, both working at the Tavistock Institute of Human Relations, began to disagree on the factors involved in separating children from their parents. In 1960, Bowlby published a paper, Grief and Mourning in Infancy and Early Childhood. In the paper Bowlby made what many in the profession considered sweeping generalisations without evidence stating that:

acute distress is the usual response of young children (between about six months and three to four years of age) to separation from the mother, regardless of circumstances and quality of substitute care; and, by implication, that there is no distinction between the responses of these infants at different levels of development.

For more than 25 years research had been conducted with direct observational studies into the effects of separation of young children from their mothers, mostly in the form of retrospective or follow-up studies. Many of the studies were performed in a hospital instead of a natural environment like the home or residential care. Anna Freud contributed to the argument with a review of Bowlby's articles. She criticised his approach stating:

Neither the Hampstead Nurseries nor hospitals and other residential homes have offered ideal conditions for the study of separation per se. We, as well as Dr Bowlby, used data collected under circumstances where the children had to adapt not only to the loss of the mother but also to the change from family to group life, a transition very difficult to achieve for any young child...

Freud stressed the lack of relevant data in which to draw conclusions:

we need to supplement our observations, excluding group or ward conditions.

In a paper entitled Brief separations, psychologist Christoph M. Heinicke and psychiatric social worker Ilse J Westheimer, both colleagues of Bowlby at the clinic, discussed their observations, stating that their data could not determine the influence of institutional factors, including that of multiple caretakers. They speculated that:

if it were possible to contrast a minimal care situation with one involving highly individualized care, then one might get quite different results.

In a paper published in 1961 entitled Maternal deprivation: Toward an empirical and conceptual re-evaluation, the paediatrician and psychologist Leon J. Yarrow conducted a review of the research and concluded that maternal separation had never been studied under pure conditions. Yarrow believed the complicating factors were always present. In Bowlby's book, Attachment and Loss, there is a passing reference to the complexities of the institutional situation, and a disappointing emphasis on the assertion that regardless of age and conditions of care, the young child's response to separation is usually the mourning sequence initiated by acute distress:

The subjects in the various studies differ, e.g. there is a variance in age, the type of home varies, the type of hospital or clinic they visit varies, the type of care they receive and the length of time they at the away from home. In spite of different backgrounds and expectations of the observers, the findings are remarkable in one aspect. That is once a child is aged six months, they tend to respond to the event of separation from mother in certain typical ways.

Without citing the evidence regarding the influence of each class of variable, Bowlby asserts that by far the most important variable is the absence of the mother, and dismisses other variables as relatively unimportant.

James and Joyce decided to try to determine the influence of variables on the behaviour of healthy young children during a ten-day separation from the mother. The couple decided to become foster parents to a series of young children by providing 24-hour support and make written and filmed observations of their reactions. James made a proposal to Bowlby, who at the time was director of the Tavistock clinic, for a new project that would look at separation in young children in much greater detail. In 1963, Bowlby assigned £1000 for the new unit and in the same year, Robertson joined her husband at the Tavistock clinic as a research associate to work on a project that would be known as Young Children in Brief Separation.

=== Young Children in Brief Separation ===
The Robertsons started their work by conducting a comprehensive research review, similar to the type of review that Yarrow conducted. The purpose of the project was to study the influence of factors such as age, level of maturity and object constancy, previous parent-child relationships and quality of substitute care, on the responses of young children to separation from their mother, seeking to identify optimal substitute care. The subjects were between 1.5 and 2.5 years old, healthy, loved and never previously out of their mothers care. The methods involved non-statistical naturalist observations throughout day while the Robertsons were away, using checklists and tape recordings. During the 1950's, James Robertson had used a 16 mm film camera to study the reactions of young children who were admitted to hospital for treatment, and he planned to make 20 minute Cinéma vérité recordings every day for later study.

One child was to be observed over a nine-day period while staying in a residential nursery, where staff were professional and kind but could not and would not provide substitute mothering or take note and consideration of individual needs of the child. Four other children were selected to be taken into a worker's home to act as a foster home where stress was eliminated and the individual needs of the child were met by one mothering person. The four children that were to be fostered were Kate, Thomas, Jane and Lucy whose mothers were going into hospital for a birth of a second child with no other family member available to care for them. The fifth child, John, whose mother was in the same situation as the other mothers, was admitted to a residential nursery. The ages of the fostered children and single residential child were as follows:

Young Children in Brief Separation children
Name	Age	Days in care	Type of care	Year of visit
Kate	2 years, 5 months	27	Fostered	1967
Jane	1 year, 5 months	10	Fostered	1968
Thomas	2 years, 4 months	10	Fostered	1971
Lucy	1 year, 9 months	19	Fostered	1976
John	1 year, 5 months	9	Residential nursery	1969

The children who were selected were healthy and happily attached to their parents and had never been subject to separation before. They were allowed to become familiar with the Robertson home. Robertson found out everything she could about the children, what their diets were, what their daily routines were and what they liked and disliked. When the children moved into the workers homes, they brought along familiar things, like family photographs, photographs of their mothers and toys. Contact between the children and their family via their father who was allowed to visit on a regular basis and if possible, on a daily basis. John in contrast didn't have a comparable placement procedure, rather he was placed in the residential nursery with their normal placement procedure.

In the case of two and half-year-old Kate, Robertson spent a month visiting the family before the project began, resulting in Kate forming a strong attachment to Robertson. Gradually Kate started to show signs of anxiety after moving into the apartment of the Robertsons. In one play episode, Kate recreated her own house and stated that she loves her parents and wants to see them, but her play parents [Joyce and James] did not seem to want her. She said Throw them in the dustbin and demanded they leave the room, but soon began to cry stating she wanted them back. For Jane the experience was worse. When her father visited she seemed remote, laughing unnaturally and crying when her father tried to leave. When she was out for a walk and recognised her own house in passing, she became distressed. The Robertsons believed that at 17 months Jane was too young to assimilate Joyce or to retain a clear image of her mother. Jane became extraordinarily attached to Joyce and remained in the state even when she went home where she had to share her mother with a new baby. Robertson believed that Jane's experience was largely positive, even learning new words. When Jane's mother arrived, she accepted her immediately. Thomas, the oldest of the group, suffered the most. He had trouble accepting Robertson's care. In the film he displays his emotions by mixing both affection and aggression towards Robertson and clearly showing his anxiety at the situation. Thomas also avoided looking at his mother's picture. The Robertsons believed that Thomas's state was one of manageable anxiety. When talking about Lucy, Robertson stated that Lucy signalled that she visit the family, which she did several times. On the last visit, Robertson and the family visit a park where Lucy invents a game of separation and reunion, in which she walks Robertson away, then runs back to her mother, then reverses the games, but at no time does she run back to Robertson.

==== Findings ====
The findings from the project which ran from 1965 to 1976 were contrary to much of the published literature. Separation per se did not cause acute stress and despair, but rather anxiety, which could be kept to a minimum allowing development to continue. Data indicated that 1 1/2-year-olds make a complete transfer to the caretaker, while 2 1/2-year-olds are more ambivalent. The institutionalised child displayed evidence of trauma and cumulative stresses after six years. Their 1971 paper Young Children in Brief Separation, A Fresh Look was also published in the journal, The Psychoanalytic Study of the Child. In the summary section, the Robertsons concluded that Bowlby had overgeneralised James Robertson's earlier findings about how children respond in institutional settings. They concluded by stating:

Our findings do not support Bowlby's generalisations about the responses of young children to separation from the mother per se, nor do they support his theory on grief and mourning in infancy and early childhood. ... but we continue to share his concern about the potential harm associated with early separation from the mother.

==== Bonding and attachement ====
The Robertsons believed that no matter how good the substitute mother, separation of the child from the mother remains a hazard for a young child due to the discontinuity of the mother-child relationship. Each of the four children were able to bond with Joyce, and after the separation, were able to reform that bond with their mother. For the Robertsons, '"bonding" refers to the feelings parents have for their children and "attachment" to the feelings children have for their parents...they run in parallel'. They distinguished the two on the grounds that 'Bonding is a mature form of loving. But the attachment of child to parent is an immature form of loving – unstable in the early months and years'. They considered that 'bonding progresses down the generations to promote the well-being of each new batch of babies...where the parents are not bonded to the children, the children are put at risk'. The Robertsons were convinced that if a substitute mother is provided, the child will reach out and bond with the substitute mother, entering into a relationship that will reduce the stress suffered by the child. They suggested that regular contract with a parent, along with reminders such a photographs of their mother would help the child cope with separation. They also suggested that when a child was placed in an unfamiliar environment, the maintenance of familiar home routines would remind them of their home and family, lessening separation anxiety.

=== Award ceremony ===
In 1969, the Robertsons attended an awards ceremony to collect an award for their film, JOHN, aged 17 months, for 9 days in a residential nursery. They were told that their film was not going to be shown. However, they decided to take along the film and a projector, on the off-chance that they could show a segment. At the ceremony they insisted on showing 10 minutes of it. Attending the ceremony was Lord Keith Joseph, at the time opposition spokesman on Social Services at the Department of Health and Social Care. He was so struck by the film that he ordered that all key people in his department watch the film. As a result, all the civil servants in the department were also affected. This resulted in an impetus that eventually led to the closure of residential care nurseries in Great Britain.

== Retirement ==
When the Robertsons retired from the Tavistock clinic, they immediately established the Robertson Centre in 1975 as an educational trust, whose remit was to promote understanding of the emotional needs of infants and young children. During their time at the centre, they continued to publish high quality articles, with a focus on adoption and fostering and as well as promoting their films.

== Awards ==
In 2003, Robertson and her husband were awarded the Bowlby-Ainsworth Award for Documenting And Improving The Lives Of Young Children In Difficult Circumstances.

== Publications ==
The following papers were written or co-written by the Robertsons:

- Robertson, Joyce; Freud, Anna (10 February 2017). "A Mother's Observations on the Tonsillectomy of Her Four-Year-Old Daughter". The Psychoanalytic Study of the Child. 11 (1): 410–427. doi:10.1080/00797308.1956.11822796.
- Robertson, Joyce (10 February 2017). "Mothering as an Influence on Early Development". The Psychoanalytic Study of the Child. 17 (1): 245–264. doi:10.1080/00797308.1962.11822847.
- Robertson, James; Robertson, Joyce; Freud, Anna (8 February 2017). "Film Review". The Psychoanalytic Study of the Child. 24 (1): 138–143. doi:10.1080/00797308.1969.11822689.
- Robertson, Joyce (24 December 2007). "The communications of early infancy: Reflections of a physiotherapist on a counselling course". Psychodynamic Counselling. 3 (2): 179–193. doi:10.1080/13533339708402485.
- Robertson, Joyce (December 2005). "A psychoanalytic perspective on the work of a physiotherapist with infants at risk of neurological problems: Comparing the theoretical background of physiotherapy and psychoanalysis". Infant Observation. 8 (3): 259–278. doi:10.1080/13698030500375677. S2CID 145333028.
- Robertson, Joyce; McGilly, Katherine (November 2009). "Comments on "Changing attitudes towards the care of children in hospital: a new assessment of the influence of the work of Bowlby and Robertson in the UK, 1940–1970" by Frank C.P. van der Horst and Rene van der Veer (Attachment & Human Development Vol 11, No 2, March 2009, 119–142)". Attachment & Human Development. 11 (6): 557–561. doi:10.1080/14616730903282514. PMID 20183556.
- Robertson, Joyce; Freud, Anna (10 February 2017). "A Mother's Observations on the Tonsillectomy of Her Four-Year-Old Daughter". The Psychoanalytic Study of the Child. 11 (1): 410–427. doi:10.1080/00797308.1956.11822796.
- Robertson, James; Robertson, Joyce (1989). Separation and the very young (1st ed.). London: Free Association Books. ISBN 9781853430978. OCLC 21212582.

Associated papers in relation to the working life of Robertson

- Ludwig-Körner, Christiane (16 May 2017). "Anna Freud and Observation: Memoirs of Her Colleagues from the Hampstead War Nurseries". Journal of Infant, Child, and Adolescent Psychotherapy. 16 (2): 131–137. doi:10.1080/15289168.2017.1307072. S2CID 148604107.

Papers and books relating to the establishment of the 1963 Young Children in Brief Separation project

- Robertson, James; Robertson, Joyce (8 February 2017). "Young Children in Brief Separation, A Fresh Look". The Psychoanalytic Study of the Child. 26 (1): 264–315. doi:10.1080/00797308.1971.11822274. PMID 5163230.
- MICIC, Z (December 1962). "Psychological stress in children in hospital". International Nursing Review. 9: 23–31. PMID 13935571.
- Prugh, Dane G.; Staub, Elizabeth M.; Sands, Harriet H.; Kirschbaum, Ruth M.; Lenihan, Ellenora A. (January 1953). "A study of the emotional reactions of children and families to hospitalization and illness". American Journal of Orthopsychiatry. 23 (1): 70–106. doi:10.1111/j.1939-0025.1953.tb00040.x. PMID 13016771.
- Schaffer, H. R. (1959). "Psychologic Effects of Hospitalization in Infancy". {Pediatrics}. 24 (4). American Academy of Pediatrics: 528–539. doi:10.1542/peds.24.4.528. ISSN 0031-4005. PMID 14442384. S2CID 245108569.
- Spitz, Rene A. (13 February 2017). "Hospitalism". The Psychoanalytic Study of the Child. 1 (1): 53–74. doi:10.1080/00797308.1945.11823126.
- Spitz, René A.; Wolf, Katherine M. (13 February 2017). "Anaclitic Depression". The Psychoanalytic Study of the Child. 2 (1): 313–342. doi:10.1080/00797308.1946.11823551.
- Burlingham, Dorothy T; Freud, Anna (1970). Young children in war-time: a year's work in a residential war nursery. Michigan: Ann Arbor, University Microfilms. OCLC 184853568.
- Freud, Anna; Burlingham, Dorothy T (1944). Infants without families; the case for and against residential nurseries. New York: International Universities Press. OCLC 818209.

Radio series

- Robertson, Joyce (27 October 1967). "The Child In Your Care". BBC Radio 4 FM. BBC Radio 4. Archived from the original on 18 October 2014.

Radio discussion on the passing of Robertson

- Matthew Bannister (2 June 2013). An actor, a child behavioural researcher, a French singer-songwriter, a chemist, a lighthouse keeper and a bass player (Radio Broadcast). Last Word. London: BBC Radio 4. "Last Word spoke to her daughter, Katherine McGilly, to the paediatric registrar Mary Lindsay and to a family friend, the psychologist Oliver James"

== See also ==
- Platt Report 1959 British government report that made wide ranging recommendations based upon the principle that children needed their parents

== Bibliography ==
- Karen, Robert (1998). Becoming Attached: First Relationships and how They Shape Our Capacity to Love. Oxford University Press. ISBN 978-0-19-511501-7.
- Klaus, Marshall H.; Kennell, John H. (1982). Parent-infant bonding (2nd ed.). St. Louis: Mosby. pp. 113–115. ISBN 0801626862.
- Robertson, James; Robertson, Joyce (1989). Separation and the very young (1st ed.). London: Free Association Books. ISBN 9781853430978. OCLC 21212582.
- "'Young Children in Brief Separation' by James and Joyce Robertson (Review)". The Therapeutic Care Journal. 1 October 2009. Archived from the original on 18 September 2026.
