= Dermod MacCarthy =

British paediatrician

- Dermod MacCarthy at award for James Spence medal.
- Born: 15 March 1911; Bournemouth, England
- Died: 12 July 1986 (aged 75)
- Education: St Bartholomew's Hospital
- Scientific career
- Fields: Pediatrics
- Workplaces: St Bartholomew's Hospital; Stoke Mandeville Hospital

Dermod de la Chevallerie MacCarthy FRCP (15 March 1911 – 12 July 1986) was a British paediatrician, notable for establishing a paediatric unit at Stoke Mandeville Hospital and conducting research into common disturbances in childhood and growth in deprived children. He was most notable for his work to encourage mothers to be with their children when in hospitals.

== Life ==
MacCarthy was the son of Sir Desmond MacCarthy, the foremost literary and dramatic critic of his day, and of Mollie Warre Cornish, the daughter of a vice-provost of Eton College. An author in her own right, Cornish wrote A Nineteenth-century childhood in 1924. MacCarthy was educated at Gresham's School and upon finishing his education there began to train as a physician at St Bartholomew's Hospital, London, where he qualified in 1934. MacCarthy took up a number of positions in medicine, before becoming a ship's doctor on a vessel travelling to the Far East.

In 1947, he married Marie-France Geoffroy-Dechaume, whom he had known since childhood, but it was only when MacCarthy was in his mid thirties that romance blossomed. During World War II, Geoffroy-Dechaume joined the French Resistance and was awarded the Croix-de-Guerre for heroism in her active service against the enemy.

== Career ==
Before the Second World War, MacCarthy had already decided to specialise and to become a paediatrician, and by the start of the war was working in Great Ormond Street Hospital. He became a Resident at about the time of the start of the Blitz, and some of his earliest duties included organizing the evacuation of children from the hospital to outlying and countryside hospitals. In 1942, he joined the Royal Naval Reserve and served as a surgeon, with the rank of Lieutenant, continuing to hold a commission until 1946.

At the beginning of the National Health Service in 1948, the idea of Pediatrics, as a profession was still very new. Indeed, the word itself was barely known, and hardly in use, outside the medical community in the United Kingdom. During that period, at the end of 1940s, paediatricians were establishing children's units across the country. MacCarthy was selected to establish a series of children's wards, working initially in Aylesbury and then putting in units across the whole of Buckinghamshire, a task he continued to work on until 1976.

MacCarthy's main contribution to paediatrics was made in the 1950s, when a movement arose to enable parents to visit their children in hospital, when they were convalescing. This movement was launched by a paper written by the paediatrician James Spence called The Care of Children in Hospital in which he argued that the parent should nurse and feel responsible for the child patient's recovery. Before this movement, visiting by parents was usually restricted and sometimes forbidden in certain hospitals. MacCarthy helped facilitate the movement by making an influential film with James Robertson, the second in the series, called Going to hospital with mother. The film was filmed in the children's ward of Amersham Hospital. MacCarthy later worked as an advisor to the newly established National Association for the Welfare of Children in Hospital. The paper written by Spence, and work done by MacCarthy and others, led to the creation of the Platt Report, which ultimately recognized that:

Parents should be allowed to visit whenever they can, and to help as much as possible with the care of the child

In 1974, MacCarthy became president of the paediatric section of the Royal Society of Medicine, while also a consultant paediatrician to the Institute of Child Psychology in London. During 1975, he was elected president of the Confederation of European Societies of Paediatricians.

== Bibliography ==
- Sailing with Mr. Belloc by Dermod MacCarthy, Collins Harvill, 1987. London
- First baby by Dermod MacCarthy; British Medical Association, 1960–1965. London
- The emotional well-being of children aged 0-5 years in hospital by Dermod MacCarthy; National Association for the Welfare of Children in Hospital. 1989
- The under fives in hospital : a report on their emotional well-being by Dermod MacCarthy; Australian Association for the Welfare of Children in Hospital., Westmead, N.S.W. 1979

== Awards ==
In 1982, MacCarthy received the prestigious James Spence Medal, named after Professor Sir James Calvert Spence, and is the highest award of the British Paediatric Association.

== See also ==
- Platt Report 1959
- Joyce Robertson
- James Robertson (psychoanalyst)
- John Bowlby
- Attachment theory
- Tavistock Institute of Human Relations
