= Ilse Hellman =

Austrian-born British child development researcher (1928–1998)

Ilse Hellman Noach
- Born: Ilse Hellman; 28 September 1908; Vienna, Austria
- Died: 3 December 1998 (aged 90); London, England
- Citizenship: Austria; United Kingdom
- Education: University of Vienna
- Occupations: Psychoanalyst; Child development expert
- Spouse: Arnold Noach (died)
- Children: 1
- Scientific career
- Fields: Child development
- Workplaces: Parents' Association Institute; Hampstead War Nurseries; Hampstead Child Therapy Course and Clinic

Ilse Hellman Noach (28 September 1908 – 3 December 1998) was an Austrian-British psychoanalyst and child development expert. She worked with child evacuees from London with psychological issues in the first two years of the Second World War under the employ of the Home Office before working at Anna Freud's Hampstead War Nurseries until the war was over. Hellman trained in psychoanalysis under Dorothy Burlingham and worked at Burlingham's and Freud's Hampsead Child Therapy Course and Clinic from 1945 until her retirement in 1992. She published From War Babies to Grandmothers: Forty-Eight Years in Psychoanalysis in 1990.

== Early life and family background ==
On 28 September 1908, Hellman was born in Vienna. She was the youngest of three children and the daughter of Paul Hellman, the textile mill owner and co-founder of the Salzburg Festival, and his wife Irene Hellman-Redlich. Hellman's family were wealthy Jews, and her parents were art patrons who encouraged the arts and promoted local distinction earning musicians such as Adolf Busch, the violinist, and Rudolf Serkin, the pianist. Both her parents and brother died in Nazi concentration camps. Hellman was educated at a Roman Catholic boys' school.

== Career ==
When she left school, and having grown a fascination with children in Vienna, she enrolled on a two-year course that specialised in juvenile delinquency and child psychology against the wishes of her family. Hellman ventured to France in 1931 and attended evening classes in child psychology at the Sorbonne whilst working at a young offenders' home for those ineligible to be sent to prison close to Paris, from 1931 to 1932. Between 1933 and 1935, she stayed in Paris working at a children's assessment centre for those from difficult backgrounds. Hellman went on to study at the University of Vienna in its Department of Child Development for two years from 1935 to 1937 under Charlotte Bühler, the Professor of Child Development. In 1937, after earning her Doctor of Philosophy degree, she was invited by Bühler to go to the Parents' Association Institute in London and aid in her study of children who had learning disabilities. Hellman remained at the Parents' Association Institute until 1939.

At the beginning of the Second World War, she was sent to the Isle of Man because she was deemed "an enemy alien". Hellman was released not long after since there was a shortage of psychiatrists addressing evacuees' emotional issues. The Home Office employed her to work with child evacuees escaping from the threat of air raids to rural areas from London from 1939 to 1941. Many of the children Hellman worked with had psychological problems from being separated from their families and had a variety of conditions such as nocturnal enuresis, eating disorders, and disturbed sleep. At 1941's end, she was invited by Anna Freud, the daughter of Sigmund Freud, to work at her Hampstead War Nurseries alongside Dorothy Burlingham. Hellman remained at the nurseries until the end of the war in 1945. Whilst working at the nurseries, she began training in psychoanalysis under Burlingham.

In 1945, Hellman was appointed an associate member of the British Psychoanalytical Society and was promoted to a full member seven years later. She was training analyst and a leading person of the Anna Freudian Group from 1955 onwards. Hellman went on to join the staff of Burlingham's and Freud's Hampstead Child Therapy Course and Clinic in 1945, and led the adolescents department and was director of the research project on adolescence alongside Liselotte Frankl. She published papers on adolescence psycho-sexual development, their suitability for psychoanalytic treatment and the difficulties of such treatment. Hellmann did other topics and taught both at the clinic and at Institute of Psycho-Analysis from 1942 to 1945. She worked with two separate analysts for each practice analysing mother and child and a coordinator to compile the findings until her worsening health forced her to retire in 1992 but maintained an interest in her profession. Hellman had published, From War Babies to Grandmothers: Forty-Eight Years in Psychoanalysis, two years earlier in 1990.

== Personal life ==
She was married to the Dutch art historian Arnold Noach following the war until his sudden death in 1976. They had a daughter, Maggie Noach, who was a literary agent. On 3 December 1998, Hellman died in London.

== Legacy ==
Clifford Yorke in Hellman's entry in the International Dictionary of Psyschoanalysis described her impact as "Generations of analysts have cause to be grateful for her guidance, instruction, and, above all, her wisdom" and wrote, "Her deeply empathic understanding of the problems encountered by students in their clinical work made her a valued mentor in work with both adults and children. Her clinical skills with children of all ages secured her international reputation."
