= Alan Williams (novelist) =

British novelist, journalist, foreign correspondent

- Born: Alan Emlyn Williams; 28 August 1935
- Died: 21 April 2020 (aged 84); London
- Occupations: Novelist, journalist, foreign correspondent
- Writing career
- Genre: Thriller

Alan Emlyn Williams (28 August 1935 – 21 April 2020) was an ex-foreign correspondent, novelist and writer of thrillers.

== Personal life ==
He was educated at Stowe, Grenoble and Heidelberg Universities, and at King's College, Cambridge, where he graduated in 1957 with a B.A. in modern languages. His father was the actor and writer Emlyn Williams. Noël Coward was his godfather. His younger brother Brook (1938–2005) was also an actor.

Journalist Philippa Toomey described him as a "talented and funny mimic with a gift for words and a stock of tales from the shaggy Express story to the grimmer side of international journalism."

He had three children. Owen (born 1977) and Laura (born 1980) with his first wife, Antonia (née Simpson). He then married literary agent Maggie Noach and their daughter Sophie was born in 1989. Together they compiled The Dictionary of Disgusting Facts.

== Journalism, and adventures behind the Iron Curtain ==
Williams' British paperback publishers would claim that his first-hand experience of adventure and intrigue was put to superb use in his novels.

As a student, he took part in the Hungarian uprising. He took a supply of penicillin to the insurgents in Budapest. He masqueraded his way into East Germany when that country was virtually closed. He was a delegate from Cambridge to the World Festival of Peace and Friendship in Warsaw, where he and some friends smuggled a Polish student to the West.

After graduating from Cambridge, Williams worked for Radio Free Europe in Munich. He then moved on to print journalism, starting at the Western Mail. He then joined The Guardian before becoming foreign correspondent for The Daily Express, covering international wars and "other horrors".

He covered stories in the Middle East, Eastern Europe, the Soviet Union, Israel and the Far East. As a reporter he covered most of the world's trouble spots – Vietnam, the Middle-East, Algeria, Czechoslovakia, Ulster, Mozambique, Cyprus and Rhodesia.

He covered two Israeli–Arab conflicts, including the Six-Day War.

In Algeria, the Foreign Office received complaints about him from both the French Army and the Arabs. Subsequently, he had to be smuggled out of the country after the word barbouze (spy) had been written on his car, In Beirut, he encountered Kim Philby the day before the latter disappeared to Moscow.

His Vietnam reporting won him much praise. Jon Bradshaw called him "perhaps the best observer of war in England. His articles on Vietnam are far and away the best pieces produced in Britain on the subject." According to Phillip Knightley, correspondents sewed their official identification tags – name and organisation – on their jackets. However, Williams' press accreditation tag carried an unintended connotation, which raised eyebrows: Alan Williams, Queen, though "it was to the disbelief of most GIs", wrote Phillip Knightley.

Journalist and war correspondent Nicholas Tomalin described Williams as his wildest friend. Williams based a character in The Beria Papers on Tomalin and, upon selling the film rights, told Tomalin that he should play himself in the movie version.

== Solzhenitsyn's Cancer Ward ==
Soviet authorities had prohibited Aleksandr Solzhenitsyn from publishing his semi-autobiographical novel Cancer Ward. The notoriety piqued British publishers' curiosity, among them The Bodley Head. Rival attempts were soon under way to obtain a copy of the manuscript. Williams and his friend Nicholas Bethell went behind the Iron Curtain to obtain the manuscript from a go-between who had a signed document attesting that he was acting on Solzhenitsyn's behalf. Both men knew they were risking their lives and time. There was no guarantee they would succeed, be the first to obtain the novel, or that The Bodley Head would purchase the manuscript let alone publish it. According to several sources, Williams smuggled the book out of Czechoslovakia, passing through the frontier post with the leaves spread out on his lap under a road map. The Bodley Head subsequently published the first Russian-language edition of the novel and the English language translation.

Williams used a fictionalised version of this incident as an ironic story element in his novel The Beria Papers. There, the protagonists pretend to smuggle a manuscript from behind the Iron Curtain.

== Critical assessment ==
Williams won immediate acclaim with his first novel: Long Run South was runner-up in the 1963 John Llewelyn Rhys Memorial Prize

Noël Coward wrote in his diary, "I have read a thriller by my godson Alan Williams called Long Run South and it is really very good indeed. He is an authentic writer. There is, as with all his generation, too much emphasis on sex, squalor and torture and horror, but it's graphically and imaginatively written."

His second novel, Barbouze, was even better received. Several critics said that it transcended the genre, lifting him into the top-most ranks of younger serious British novelists. The Sunday Telegraph declared Barbouze a compassionate thriller. The Sunday Times praised the exuberance and poetry in the writing which the reviewer noted was then very rare in British fiction.

Williams remained a favourite of the critics over the years. Books & Bookmen called Williams "the natural successor to Ian Fleming." British Book News said "Alan Williams is a thriller writer who has conspicuously succeeded in the rare feat of combining a novelist's art with a journalist's training." The New York Times critic Martin Levin said, "If you were to ask me who were the top ten writers of intrigue novels, I would list Alan Williams among the first five."

His fellow writers also lauded him. Williams was a firm favourite of spy novelist John Gardner who said The Beria Papers and Gentleman Traitor "were both ahead of their time" and described Williams as "one of the important figures in the change and development of the espionage novel." Gardner subsequently called The Beria Papers one of the ten greatest spy novels ever written. Author and critic H.R.F. Keating praised the "authentic feel" of his novels, adding "their pacy excitement derives from their author's writing skill." And according to crime author Mike Ripley, "a good thriller can take you to an entirely foreign environment, as in the books of Alan Williams." Bestselling author Robert Ludlum was a devotee. He especially admired Holy of Holies, insisting that it "will glue you to your chair with suspense."

== Film adaptations ==
The Pink Jungle is an adaptation of Snake Water. The film, which starred James Garner, Eva Renzi and George Kennedy was neither a critical or financial success. Williams deemed it the worst film he'd ever seen in his life. He complained that the film-makers took the characters' names and nothing else from his novel.

Dirk Bogarde had hoped to make a film of Barbouze co-starring Orson Welles with Bryan Forbes directing, but this came to nothing.

A proposed film of Long Run South, to have been filmed on location in 1967, never materialised.

Richard Burton purchased film rights to The Tale of the Lazy Dog. Shillingford Productions currently holds film rights.

== Bibliography ==
=== Novels ===
- Long Run South [1962]
- Barbouze [1964] US title: "The False Beards"
- Snake Water [1965]
- The Brotherhood [1968] US title and UK paperback reprint title: "The Purity League"
- The Tale of the Lazy Dog [1970]
- The Beria Papers [1973]
- Gentleman Traitor [1975]
- Shah-Mak [1976] US paperback retitled "A Bullet for the Shah"
- The Widow's War [1978]
- Dead Secret [1980]
- Holy of Holies [1981]

=== Novelizations ===
From 1991-1992, Boxtree Ltd of London published six paperback tie-ins to the TV series L.A. Law. Numbers 2 through 6 adapted teleplays. Numbers 1 and 2, written under the book series' house pseudonym "Charles Butler", featuring original stories, were written by Williams:

- L.A. Law (#1): The Partnership
- L.A. Law (#2): A Fair Trial

=== Non-fiction ===
- Williams, Alan. Noach, Maggie. The Dictionary of Disgusting Facts [1986] Foreword by Sir Les Patterson.

=== As contributor ===
- Williams, Alan (as contributor). "Vietnam Views". A magazine article reprinted in Bradshaw's Guide: The Best of Current Magazine Writing compiled by Jon Bradshaw. Leslie Frewin, London, [1968], 208 pages. pp. 86–107. Also features contributions from Tom Wolfe, Anthony Burgess, V. S. Naipaul, and John Mortimer.

=== Editor ===
- Williams, Alan. The Headline Book of Spy Fiction [1992] Compilation of excerpts from spy novels by himself and other authors. Includes ending from Williams' own novel Gentleman Traitor.
