= Maggie Noach =

English literary agent (1949–2006)

- Born: 18 August 1949; Chelsea, London, England
- Died: 17 November 2006 (aged 57); London, England
- Occupation: Literary agent
- Years active: 1958–2006
- Spouses: Andrew Delory (divorced): Alan Williams
- Children: 1
- Parent: Ilse Hellman (mother)

Maggie Noach (18 August 1949 – 17 November 2006) was an English literary agent who established her own eponymous agency called The Maggie Noach Agency in 1982. The clients she represented included such as authors as Brian Aldiss, David Almond, Colin Greenland, Anthony Horowitz, Garry Kilworth, Linda Newbery, Giles Milton and Jean Ure who went on win major literary and children's awards. Noach and her husband Alan Williams published The Dictionary of Disgusting Facts in 1986. She was elected chairperson of the Anthony Powell Society in 2001 and was involved in the politics of the Conservative Party.

== Early life ==
On 18 August 1949, Noach was born in Chelsea, London. She was the only daughter of the Austrian psychoanalyst Ilse Hellman and the Dutch art professor Arnold Noach. Noach was raised in Chelsea by her Austrian nanny, Gretel, because her parents were mainly occupied with their jobs. She went to the private all-girls Francis Holland School close to her residence from 1955 and was a multiple winner of the Janet Lloyd Jones Essay Cup. Noach also excelled in ballet dancing.

== Career ==
When she left school, she did not matriculate to university and instead found employment working as a secretary for the literary agency A.P. Watt at the age of 19. Noach's effort allowed her to obtain a promotion to their foreign rights department and obtained the skills needed to establish her own eponymous agency in 1982. Her agency, The Maggie Noach Agency, specialised in children's books and included such authors as Brian Aldiss, David Almond, Colin Greenland, Anthony Horowitz, Garry Kilworth, Linda Newbery, Giles Milton and Jean Ure. In 1986, Noach and Alan Williams published The Dictionary of Disgusting Facts. The authors she represented won multiple major American and British literary awards and each of the major children's book accolades. One of the books Noach was involved in was made into a film and one was broadcast on prime time television.

Outside of her work, she was elected chairperson of the Anthony Powell Society in 2001, and a member of the Conservative Party, becoming involved in their politics. In 2003, Noach and several other children's writers signed a letter published in The Guardian denouncing the Iraq War. She served on the Francis Holland School Council; was a stalwart of the Ravenscourt Park walled garden; was actively involved with the St Mary Abbots church in Kensington; wrote the Romantic Weekend Guide and performed at the Royal Albert Hall in Messiah.

== Personal life ==
Noach was an extrovert, and a member of the Church of England. She was twice married; firstly to Andrew Delory until their divorce and secondly to Alan Williams with whom she has a daughter. On 17 November 2006, she died in London when complications from an operation on her spine led to heart failure..
