= Hampstead War Nurseries =

London based wartime shelter

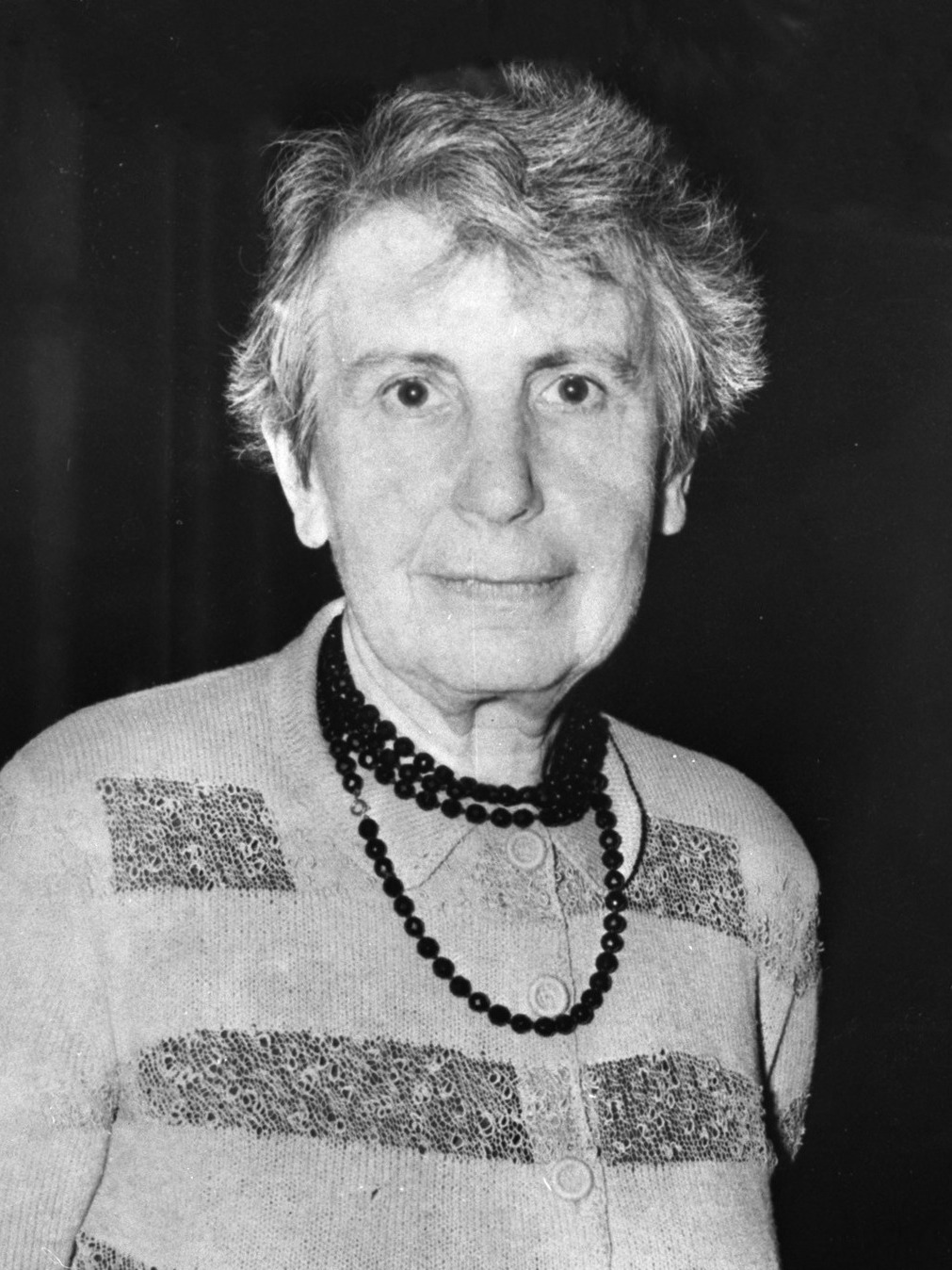
Anna Freud along with Dorothy Burlingham opened the nursery in 1941

Hampstead War Nurseries was a wartime shelter for children and their families who had been bombed or displaced during World War II and existed between 1941 and 1945. It was established by Anna Freud and her life partner, American child psychoanalyst Dorothy Burlingham in January 1941 to provide a home.

== Formation ==
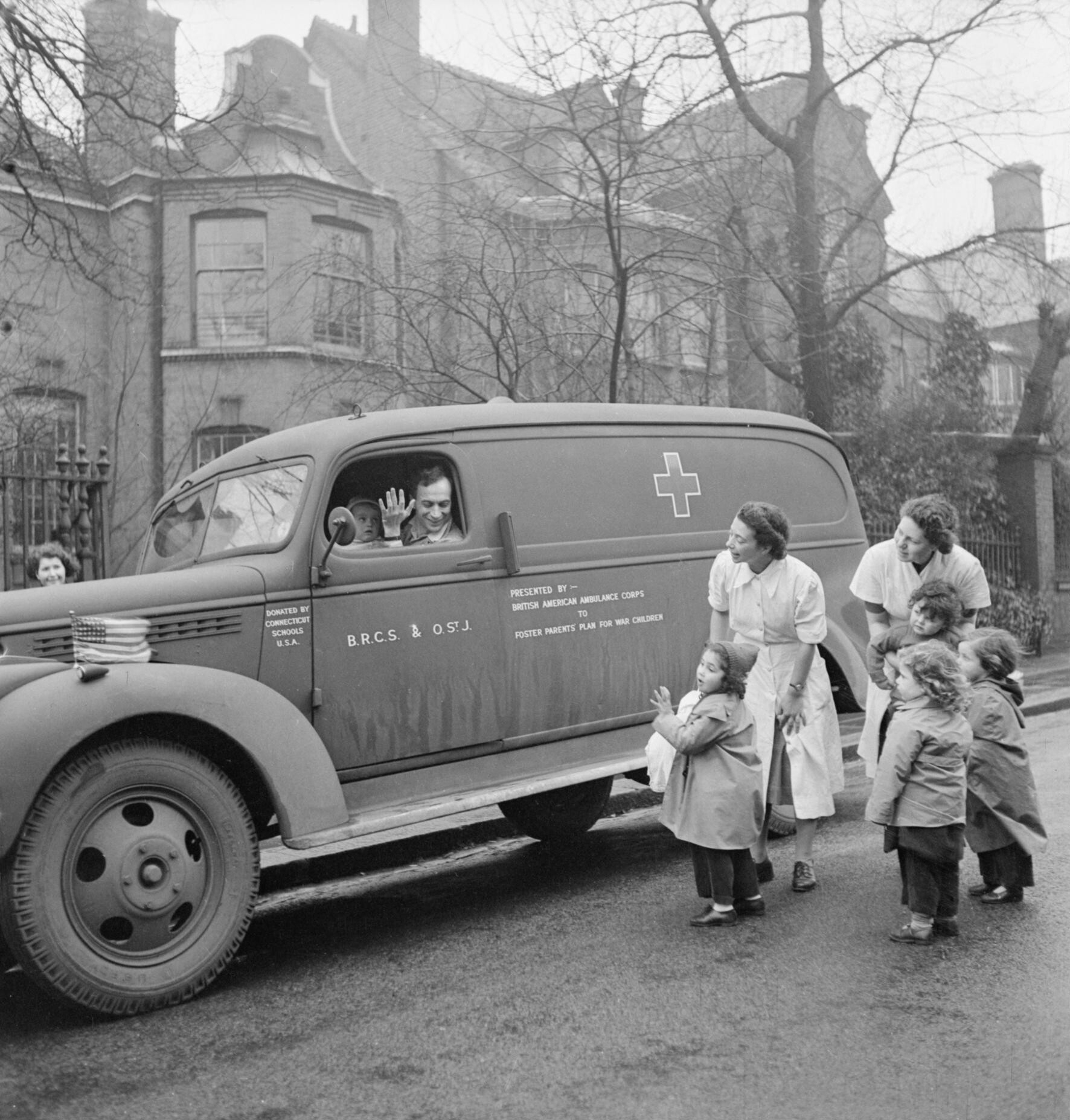
Eric Muggeridge, Director of Foster Parents Plan for War Children, is seen leaving the nursery in 1941.

In June 1938, the psychoanalysts Anna Freud and her father Sigmund Freud had moved to 20 Maresfield Gardens, Hampstead in London from Vienna, after the Nazi Anschluss. With the death of her father in September 1939, Anna Freud became heavily involved in the community of psychoanalysts in London. When the Luftwaffe Blitz of London began in September 1940, many children were left homeless and some without a family or only a single parent. When the scale of the problem became apparent, Freud decided to open a temporary wartime shelter for displaced children. In October 1940, Freud and Burlingham were presented with a sum of money from friends and began planning to open a children's nursery. Several months later in January 1941, Freud and Burlingham were sufficiently prepared to establish the "Children's Rest Centre" at 13 Wedderburn Road in Hampstead. Additional funding for the unit was provided by the American Foster Parents Plan for War Children charity known as Plan. A requirement of the funding was that monthly reports had to be prepared for the charity, and the first of these recorded that 25 children whose ages ranged from 6 months to 9 years had been provided with shelter. In 1974, a complete set of reports covering the period the nursery was opened, were published by Freud and Burlingham. Most of the early group of children who initially arrived at the centre, came from the East End of London that had been badly bombed.

=== Operating model and staffing ===
The operating model for the Hampstead nursery, had already been established before Freud arrived in London. It was based on what was proved to be workable, at what was known as the "Jackson nursery" founded in Vienna between 1937-1938 by an American child psychiatrist Edith Banfield Jackson and run by Freud and Burlingham. It was classed as an "experimental day nursery for toddlers", experimental, as at that time, nursery for children at that age was unknown.

As well as Freud and Burlingham, who were the directors of the Hampstead unit, several staff members of the Vienna nursery who had fled the Nazis, also worked in Hampstead. Amongst those were the paediatrician Josephine Stross, Liselotte Frankl, an Austrian psychologist and Austrian-British psychoanalyst Ilse Hellman. Hedy Schwartz was a nursery assistant who educated the children in the Montessori method of education. James Robertson worked as the fire watcher at the nursery and as a general maintenance man. Robertson also acted in the role of a father-figure to many of the children without fathers. His wife, Joyce Robertson, a psychiatric social worker worked there in a central role as nursery assistant and child behaviour researcher.

=== New nurseries ===
In March 1941, the charity took full responsibility for financing the nursery and suggested to Freud that she should open two new nurseries, one for very small children and one to be specifically used for evacuation of children, in the country. In June 1941, Freud opened a new residential nursery in a large house at 5 Netherhall Gardens in London and moved in the following month. The new nursery was explicitly staffed to only accept children aged up to 2.5 years old and was able to sleep up to 50 children. Formerly known as the Babies' Rest Centre, it became the new house while the first nursery was known as the old house. By July 1941, 29 children were staying there. In August 1941, Freud took possession of what was termed the Country house, a 1930's style mansion, at New Barn, Lindsell, Essex. By August 1941, 18 older children from the Children's Rest Centre had moved to the new house. After they moved, the house was closed down for repair and refurbishment. By September, the other two houses held a total of 80 children, 50 at Netherhall Gardens and the rest at New Barn. By December, this group had been joined by a further 20 non-residential children. One of them was "Minna" who was 4-and-a-half and who had lived at Regent's Park Underground Station for the last year.

Nursery children being cared for while at the Hampstead nursery

Babies in their baskets in the basement air raid shelter

Mary Conroy and Phyllis Terry, both 2 preparing to wash themselves

The night nurse checks on the toddlers as they sleep in their bunks in the air raid shelter.

Children sleeping in bunks, protected by a mesh.

A night nurse comforting a baby to sleep in the air raid shelter.

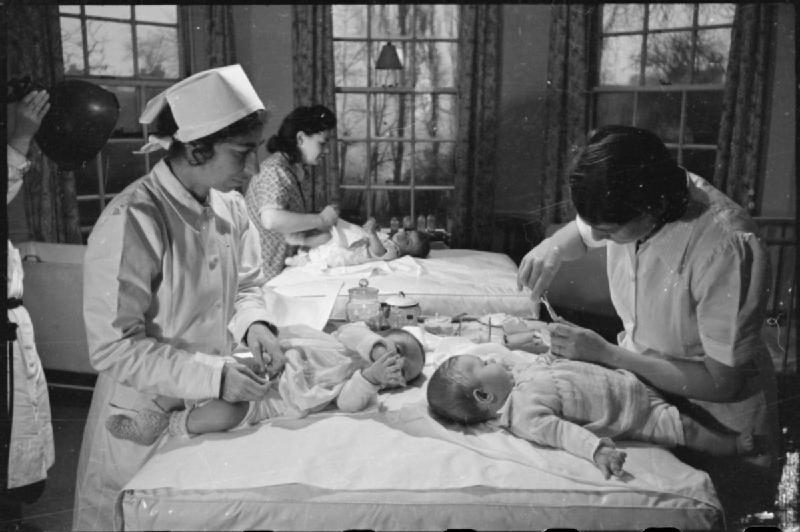
Babie getting their nappies changed. The nurse on the right is cutting the babies nails.

An employee preparing milk bottles for the babies.

== Training ==
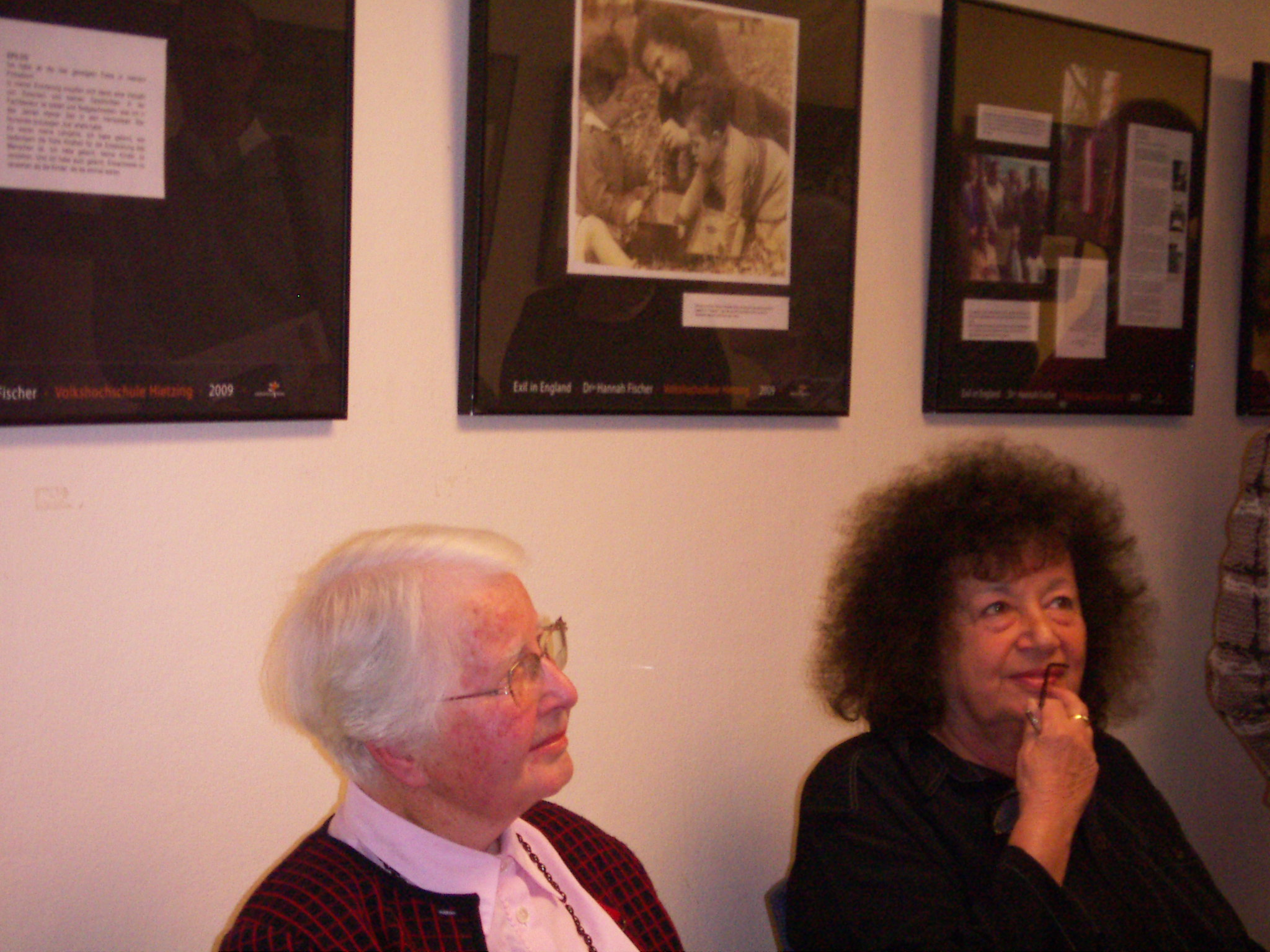
Hannah Fischer with her former pupil Elizabeth T. Spira who was a resident in the nursery.

Beginning in March 1941, the staff at the nursery held a lunch-time meeting where they discussed the children's development, whether they sucked their thumb, whether they became aggressive as well as toilet training and specifics related to a particular children. The output of these meetings was formalised in November 1941 into a deliverable curriculum that was delivered into training sessions that ran between 2.15 and 3.15 every Monday, Wednesday and Friday. Subjects that were covered included health and fitness, mental development and emotional development. Short vocational courses were also held. The Montessori education method was also taught in an on-going basis.

Beginning in June 1942 in a project that lasted three months, staff were required to answer set question papers. Subjects covered included character formation, nursery education, feeding and sleeping development under the heading, "Instinctual Development". The set question also asked staff for daily time breakdown of activities spent across the headings of child bodily development, intellectual development and transformation of instinctual drives. One student who attended training were nursery school teacher Hannah Fischer who taught Scottish-Austrian television journalist Elizabeth T. Spira, a resident.

Training was sufficiently advanced by 1942-1943 to enable students to be temporarily seconded to local schools to offer advice and help for children affected by the bombing. In total, around 66 students were trained during the war years, in courses that lasted from 1 year to 4 years.

In March 1942, 90 infants and schoolteachers visited the nursery, to take part in a "nursery work in wartime" course.

== Latter years and closure ==
By June 1942, the number of children in the nursery reached 127. By 1943, the average was around 120. When a measles outbreak occurred in February 1943, the original house became an infirmary for sick children. When the aerial bombing resumed in June 1944, 74 children were evacuated to the country house leaving 13 in London.

With the end of the war, the children were resettled. Beginning in May 1945 to November 1945, the 62 remaining children were returned to their families where possible. As leases expired, the houses were sold off, and when the house was sold, staff gradually left, in dribs and drabs. Netherhall gardens closed in June 1945. The Hampsead nursery closed in December 1945.

Nursery children being cared for while at the Hampstead nursery

A boy plays with his 'push-along' toy dog in 1941.

Two babies undergo sun ray treatment at nursery. All three wear special sun goggles to protect their eyes from the light.

Small children play with educational toys at a table in the nursery.

A nurse with three children returning after their daily walk.

Teddy Hydd drinking orange juice. His elder brother died from shelter pneumonia.

A corner of the nurseries larder.

A boy being potty trained. Each child had their own chamber pot.

The children's gas masks in the air raid shelter.

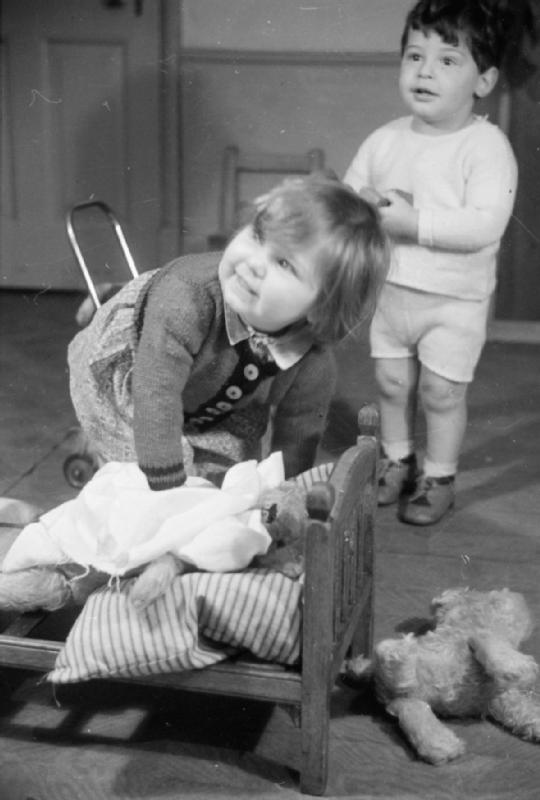
Phyllis Terry puts her teddy bear to bed, whilst her friend Peter looks on.

== Observations ==
When Freud opened the nursery, their primary aims were to repair the damage done to the children and prevent further harm coming to them. However, they recognised that they could conduct research and training and to do this they observed the small children to build a psychological "picture" of each child. Freud stated:

The variation in the case material made it possible to see children, almost from birth, in contact with their mothers or deprived of mother care, breast fed or bottle fed, in the throes of separation or reunited with their lost objects, in contact with their mother substitutes and teachers, and developing relations with their contemporaries. The stages of libidinal and aggressive development, the process and the effects of weaning and toilet training, the acquisition of speech and of the various ego functions could be followed closely.

Observations were made by staff, in normal everyday language as much as possible and recorded on index cards and the information pooled so a large body of data was constructed for each child, that in turn allowed the creation of development charts for each child. Analysis of the data enabled the staff to research a topic which would be theoretically tested against that data, for example "responses to substitute mothering" or "the effects of group living’. Data gathered that month, would help form the monthly reports for that period, that began in February 1941. Eventually the corpus of data became known as the "Hampstead Index" that was used to inform a large body of child psychoanalytic theory and in particular Freuds "development lines".

Many of the children had experienced bombing and particularly the sound of air-raid horns before they arrived at the nursery. The first observations were done to determine these effects. The group expected to find "traumatic shock" but instead found more complex reactions. Freud eventually identified 5 types of air-raid anxiety and often the child's reaction was determined by how their parent reacted. Freud then looked at the effects of sudden separation and was able to categorise those effects as dependent on age. Carol, a 17-month-old child, kept repeating "mum" for three days after being separated. When sitting in a care-givers lap, she would look away but cry when she looked the care-givers face and finding it wasn't her mum. An older child between 3-4 years, e.g. Billie aged 42 months was more ambivalent in his behaviour. He would behave extremely well but was worried about his mum going into hospital with a bad leg, who he had kicked. He believed that the separation was a punishment.

Different communication modes was another aspect the nursery group examined as children don't speak of their experiences, in the same manner as adults. The children were observed to play out their experiences. For example Bertie, aged 48 months who had lost his father, would build paper houses and then bomb them with marbles. It would be months later before he would speak of his fathers death. Another discovery was when children would regress to a more infantile state. Children who were dry in bed at night would then wet the bed, as a baby. Freud stated:

When the attachment to the parents is destroyed... all these new achievements lose their value for the child … There is no sense anymore in being good, clean, or unselfish.

=== Maternal deprivation studies ===
Within a short period, Freud began to become aware of separation anxiety in the children when they were separated from their mothers. While Freud was aware of the physical harm that children could be exposed to, the emotional harm they experienced being separated from their parents was only gradually understood. This led to a decision to involve the children's parents in the nursery as much as possible, but while that was seen enabling some children to be close to the parents, it wasn't a panacea due to the war. Other children who couldn't or didn't have a parents suffered from the lack of an attachment figure. Their emotional needs weren't being addressed. To mitigate these responses, Freud and Burlingham arranged the children into groups of 4 or 5 with a central mother-figure, in essence creating family units, which had an immediate effect. Freud stated:

The result of this arrangement was astonishing in its force and immediacy. The need for individual attachment … came out in a rush and in the course of one week all six families were completely and firmly established.

The formation of pseudo-families quickly reverted the children's development delays. However, that led to further complications when the mother-figure left employment or had to leave the nursery for an extended period, for example training. An example was Reggie, who had been raised by the care-giver from 5 months old and who left employment when he was 32 months old. He became, angry, anxious and somewhat lost. When she came for a visit, he refused to look at her.

It was also recognised that the lack of a father-figure caused emotional distress but not to the same level as lack of a mother-figure. Observations found it impacted identifications, superego development and object constancy. For example, Tony who was 4 years old, mentioned his father continuously. Freud and Burlingham stated in "Infants without families":

When we picked blackberries, flowers, leaves, he wanted to keep them all safe for his father. When a child fell down and cried, he would say (referring to an accident of his father's): "My daddy did not cry when he fell out of the army lorry, did he?" When he saw a child run, he would automatically say: "My daddy can run much faster".

To address this behaviour, Freud employed 6 conscientious objectors as gardener's and maintenance men who could act as father-figures. The psychoanalyst James Robertson was one of these men. She also maintained contact with the children's fathers to ensure they continued to visit the child. For children who had no fathers or didn't ever know their father, these man became particularly important. One child, Martin, aged 16 months began to identify with a man named "Big Bill" and wear a similar cap and call himself the same name. This helped Martin form his masculine identity.
