= The Dictionary of Disgusting Facts =

1986 book by Alan Williams

- First edition front cover.
- Author: Alan Williams; Maggie Noach
- Language: English
- Genre: Non-fiction
- Publisher: Futura
- Publication date: 1986
- Publication place: United Kingdom
- Media type: Print (paperback)
- Pages: 157
- ISBN: 9780708828885
- OCLC: 20722858

The Dictionary of Disgusting Facts is a 1986 book by Alan Williams and Maggie Noach. This cult oddity is a collection of often disgusting anecdotes and definitions.

The foreword is by Barry Humphries' alter ego Sir Les Patterson.

One entry defines a "sootikin" as a small mouse-shaped deposit formed in the vaginal cleft of poor women who did not wear undergarments - common until the 19th century. A sootikin built up over several weeks, even months, of not washing. It was composed of particles of soot, dirt, sweat, smegma and vaginal and menstrual discharge. When it reached a certain size and weight, it tended to work loose and drop from under the woman's skirt.

Another entry tells of a woman found drowned with an unusual substance in her lungs.

The authors claim that actor Richard Burton was on one occasion desperate to urinate while on stage performing Henry V. Burton turned his back on the audience and attempted to urinate discreetly through his chain-mail suit. The urine flowed down into the hot footlights and boiled, creating enough steam that the front rows of the theatre had to be evacuated.

Another anecdote tells how Philip Murray, son of classical scholar and Oxford don Gilbert Murray, fell in love at first sight with a female chimpanzee. He got her drunk on Fundador brandy, took her to his suite at the plush Victoria Hotel where he bathed her with plenty of lavender soap. Nothing more was heard of them for 48 hours. Friends, concerned, forced their way into his suite and found Murray in a corner, seriously ill with a high temperature. He died several hours later from a strain of pneumonia known only to exist among apes.

Despite having commissioned a review for Literary Review by David Profumo editor Auberon Waugh was so disgusted by the material that he "felt the few remaining hairs stand on end." Kate Kellaway, then his deputy, rocked with laughter and hero-worshipped David Profumo for reviewing the book.

Author and critic Neil Gaiman, who recommends the book, has said that this is the one book that people return to him punctiliously.
