= Pacifist Service Unit =

UK charities for pacifists and conscientious objectors

Pacifist Service Units (PSUS) were special charitable organisations that were formed in the United Kingdom during World War II to enable conscientious objectors and pacifists to provide a social service function to the community at large in a way that was in agreement with their beliefs.

== Creation ==
PSUS were brought into existence by the War Charities Act of 27 June 1940 that resulted in 14 units being established in cities across England. The organisations first meeting was held in Dick Sheppard House, 6 Endsleigh Street, Bloomsbury in May 1940.
