= Dorothy Burlingham =

American psychoanalyst (1891–1979)

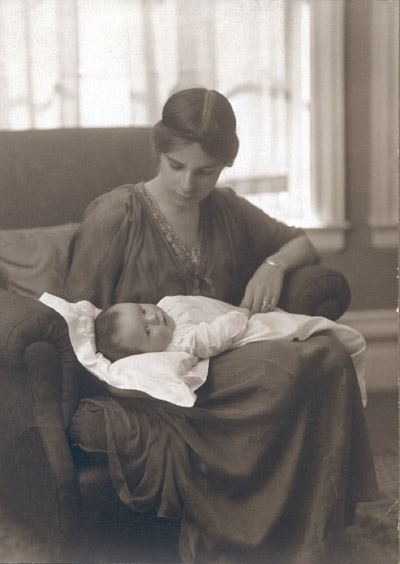
- Burlingham with her son Robert Burlingham Jr. ca. 1915
- Born: Dorothy Trimble Tiffany; 11 October 1891; New York City, US
- Died: 19 November 1979 (aged 88); London, England
- Resting place: Golders Green Crematorium
- Occupation: Psychoanalyst
- Known for: Observations of blind children; Child analysis
- Spouse: Robert Burlingham (m. 1914; sep 1921)
- Partner: Anna Freud
- Children: 4
- Parents: Louis Comfort Tiffany (father); Louise Wakeman Knox (mother)
- Relatives: Charles Lewis Tiffany (grandfather)

Dorothy Trimble Tiffany Burlingham (11 October 1891 – 19 November 1979) was an American child psychoanalyst and educator. A lifelong friend and partner of Anna Freud, Burlingham is known for her joint work with Freud on the analysis of children. During the 1960s and 70s, Burlingham directed the Research Group on the Study of Blind Children at the Hampstead Clinic in London. Her 1979 article on blind infants, "To Be Blind in a Sighted World," published in The Psychoanalytic Study of the Child, is considered to be a landmark of empathic scientific observation.

Burlingham was the daughter of Louise Wakeman Knox and artist Louis Comfort Tiffany, and the granddaughter of Charles Lewis Tiffany, founder of Tiffany & Co.

== Young adult: New York and Europe ==
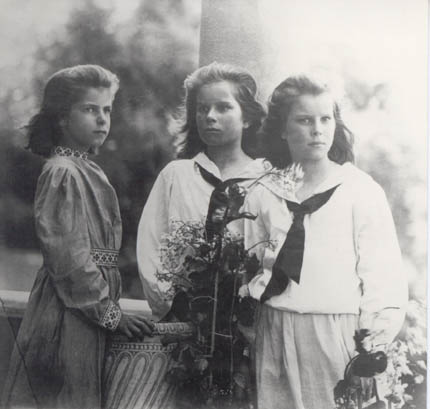
(l. to r.) Dorothy Trimble Tiffany, aged seven, with her older twin sisters Julia and Louise, aged ten, in 1898.

Dorothy Trimble Tiffany was born in New York City. She married a New York City surgeon, Robert Burlingham, in 1914; however the couple separated in 1921 on account of Robert's bipolar disorder. Burlingham was also now raising four children, one of whom, a son, had developed a skin disorder, which was diagnosed to be psychosomatic. This was also the time that the new field of psychoanalysis was becoming better known in both Europe and the United States.

Holding out hope for a psychoanalytic cure for her son, Burlingham moved to Vienna with her four children in 1925. She soon began a lay analysis with Theodore Reik, before she moved to start an analysis with Sigmund Freud. She also met Anna Freud, who was already an analyst, and who took in all the Burlingham children as her patients. Soon, the Burlingham boy's skin disorder disappeared. This cure led Burlingham to become a lay analyst herself and, in preparation, to complete an analysis with Sigmund Freud, even though by now she had become personally close to Anna Freud. Her children's analyses and her own lasted the rest of their days.

== Work ==
Burlingham moved to London in 1938 along with the Freuds, who were fleeing Nazi antisemitism. After Sigmund Freud's death the following year, Dorothy Burlingham settled at 2 Maresfield Gardens, not far from Anna Freud, and in 1940 she moved into the Freud home at 20 Maresfield Gardens, where she lived out her days. The two, who would remain partners for the next forty years, would found the Hampstead War Nurseries during World War II, and their joint work there would lead to the publication of Infants Without families (1943). They would also go on to found, along with Helen Ross, in 1951, the Hampstead Clinic, a center which "set out to provide therapy and assistance to families, to treat disturbed and handicapped children irrespective of their problems, social background or past history, and at the same time to offer aspiring analysts the most balanced and rich training possible." Both Burlingham and Freud would work at Hampstead until retirement. Her children, Robert and Mary, returned to London for psychoanalysis with Freud as adults. Robert died in 1970 and Mary died by suicide in Anna Freud's house in July 1974.

Burlingham died in London in 1979. Her ashes rest in the "Freud Corner" at the Golders Green Crematorium, London, next to those of Anna Freud (who died in 1982) and of other members of the Freud family, including Sigmund Freud.
