= Children's hospital =

Hospital that offers its services exclusively to children

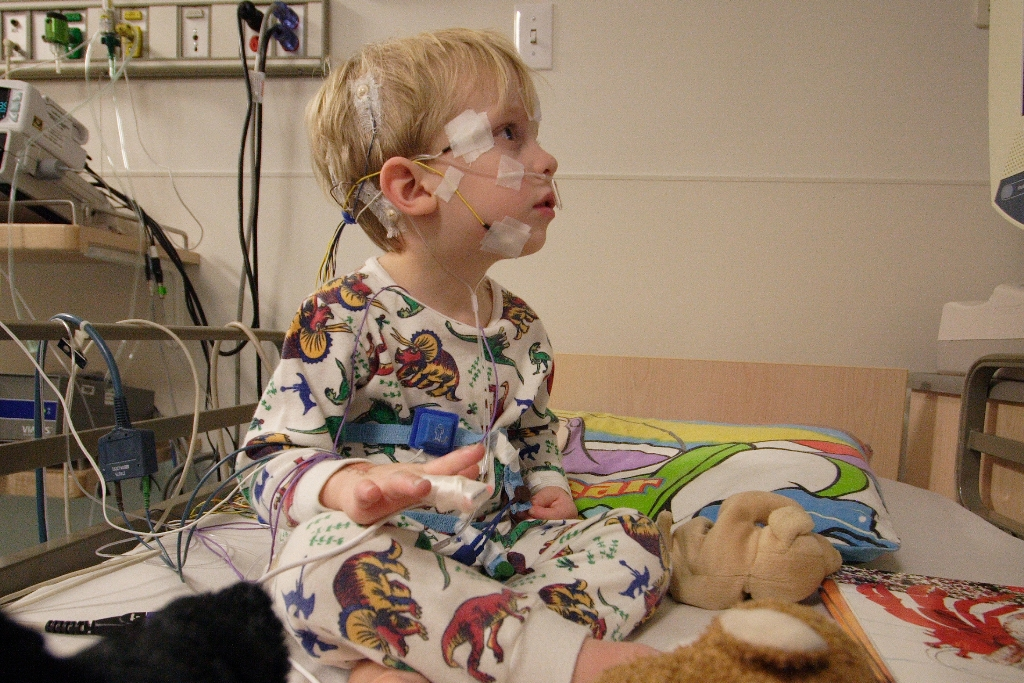
Young boy at the St. Louis Children's Hospital

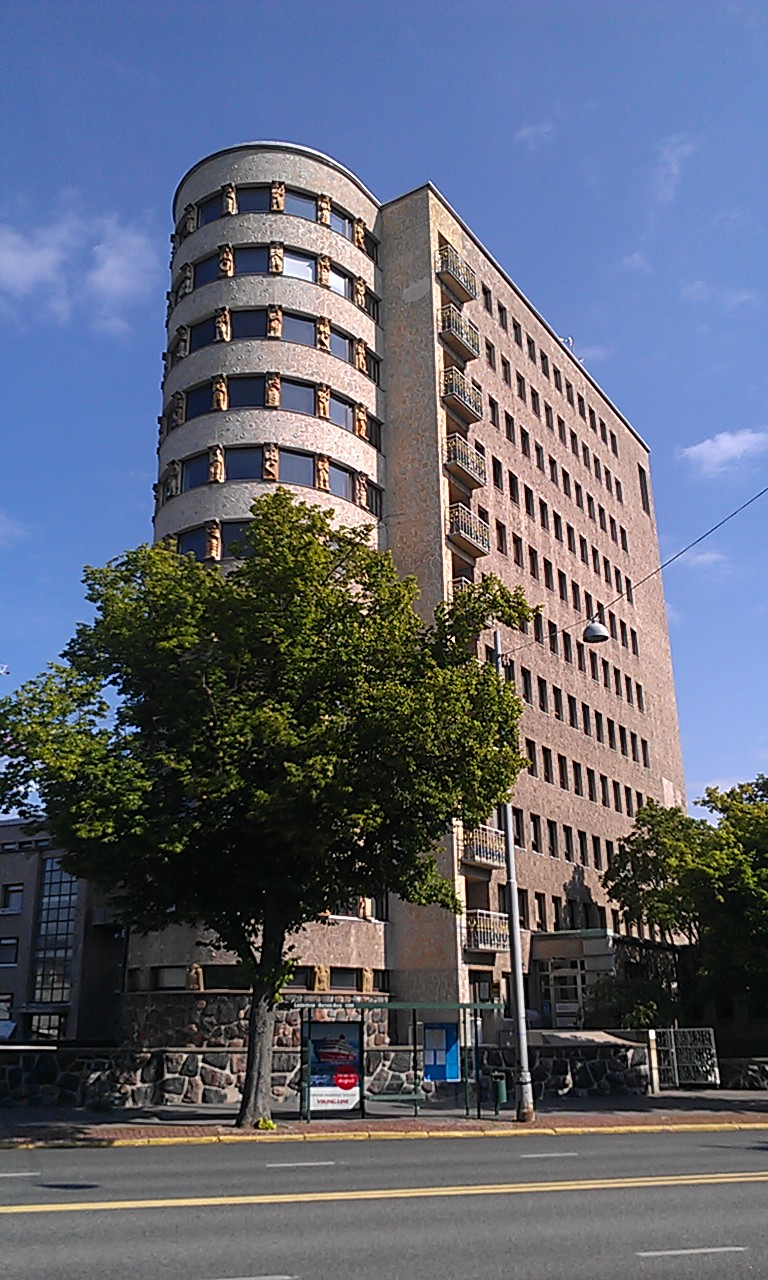
Children's Castle (Lastenlinna), a former children's hospital, that preceded the current New Children's Hospital, in Helsinki, Finland

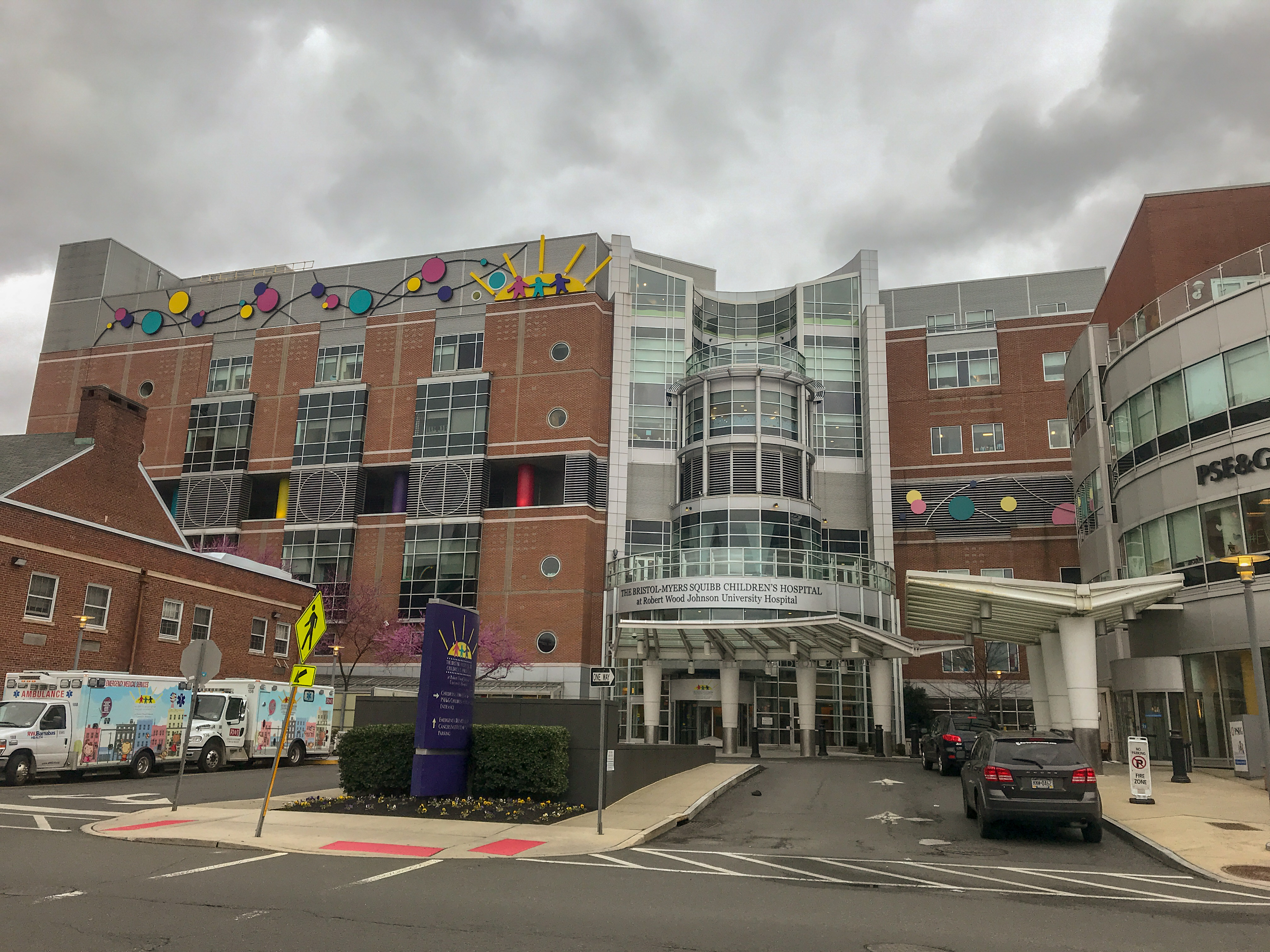
The front facade of Bristol-Myers Squibb Children's Hospital in New Brunswick, New Jersey

A children's hospital (CH) is a hospital that offers its services exclusively to infants, children, adolescents, and young adults from birth up to until age 18, and through age 21 and older in the United States. In certain special cases, they may also treat adults. The number of children's hospitals proliferated in the 20th century, as pediatric medical and surgical specialties separated from internal medicine and adult surgical specialties.

== Integration ==
Children's hospitals are characterized by greater attention to the psychosocial support of children and their families. Some children and young people have to spend relatively long periods in hospital, so having access to play and teaching staff can also be an important part of their care. With local partnerships, this can include trips to local botanical gardens, zoos, and public libraries for instance. Designs for the new Cambridge Children's Hospital, approved in 2022, plan to fully integrate mental and physical health provision for children and young people, bringing together services of three partners: Cambridge University Hospitals NHS Foundation Trust, Cambridgeshire and Peterborough NHS Foundation Trust, and the University of Cambridge with physical and mental health services located alongside research activity.

== Staffing ==
In addition to psychosocial support, children's hospitals have the added benefit of being staffed by professionals who are trained in treating children. A medical doctor that undertakes vocational training in paediatrics must also be accepted for membership by a professional college before they can practice paediatrics. These include the Royal Australasian College of Physicians (RACP), Royal College of Paediatrics and Child Health (RCPCH), and the American Board of Pediatrics. In New Zealand, the RACP offers vocational training in paediatrics. Once RACP training is completed the doctor is awarded the Fellowship of the RACP (FRACP) in paediatrics. While many normal hospitals can treat children adequately, pediatric specialists may be a better choice when it comes to treating rare afflictions that may prove fatal or severely detrimental to young children, in some cases before birth. Also, many children's hospitals will continue to see children with rare illnesses into adulthood, allowing for a continuity of care.

== History ==
=== Early voluntary care ===
Prior to 19th-century hospital reforms, the well-being of the child was thought to be in the hands of the mother; therefore, there was little discussion of children's medicine, and as a result next to no widespread formal institutions which focused on healing children.

Dispensaries and foundling hospitals were the earliest forms of what would later become children's hospitals. Florence's Hospital of the Innocent (Ospedale degli Innocenti) was originally a charity based orphanage which opened in 1445; its aim was to nurse sick and abandoned infants back to health. Foundling hospitals such as the Foundling Hospital founded by Thomas Coram in 1741 were created to receive abandoned infants, nurse them back to health, teach them a trade or skill, and integrate them back into society.

Dispensaries funded by donations also provided medicine and medical attention to those who could not afford private care. The Scottish paediatrician George Armstrong, who established the first British dispensary, in 1769, was against in-patient care for sick children. Armstrong stated:

But a very little reflection will clearly convince any thinking person that such a Scheme as this can never be executed. If you take away a sick child for its Parents or Nurse, you break its heart immediately.

Objections to admission were sometimes based on pragmatic reasons, e.g. reducing the threat of cross infection from children with diseases such as typhus, diphtheria and measles, that were a major cause of infant mortality. The voluntary nature of hospitals meant that such outbreaks were very costly.

=== 19th-century models ===
In the mid-19th century western world, middle-class women and physicians became increasingly concerned about the well-being of children in poor living conditions. Although infant mortality had begun to decline, it still remained a prominent issue. Social reformers blamed the emergence of the industrial society and poor parents for not properly caring for their children. By the 1870s, the prevalent view among doctors and nurses was that children were better off by being removed to hospital, away from the often poor, unsanitary conditions at home. In response, reformers and physicians founded children's hospitals.

By the early 19th century, children's hospitals opened in major cities throughout Europe. The first formally recognized paediatrics hospital was the Hôpital des Enfants Malades in Paris, which opened in 1802. Great Ormond Street Hospital was established in London in 1852, and was the first British children's hospital. The Children's Hospital of Philadelphia in Pennsylvania was created in 1855. The Royal Hospital for Sick Children, Edinburgh, was the first children's hospital in Scotland and opened in 1860. The Hospital for Sick Children in Toronto, Ontario, was the first Canadian children's hospital and opened in 1875. By the end of the 19th century, and the during the first two decades of the 20th century, the number of children's hospitals tripled in both Canada and the United States. From the 1850s to around 1910, most cities in the UK had built children's hospitals, which included a large number of prestigious hospitals such as the Royal Hospital for Sick Children, Glasgow, Great Ormond Street Hospital and the Royal Manchester Children's Hospital.

Early western children's hospitals were independent institutions funded by voluntary donations, and from research. Often, children could only be admitted if they were sponsored by a letter of recommendation from a hospital affiliate. The "undeserving poor" were sent to workhouse infirmaries, whilst middle class children were generally cared for, and indeed operated on, at home. Hospitals set their own rules and had their own way of working, including regulating admissions. They often excluded children under the age of two on humanitarian and pragmatic grounds and were often hesitant to admit children who required long-term care in fear that those lives would be lost or that long-term care would block beds for those in immediate need.

Early children's hospitals focused more on short-term care and treating mild illnesses rather than long-term intensive care. Treating serious diseases and illnesses in early children's hospitals could result in the disease spreading throughout the hospital which would drain already limited resources. A serious disease outbreak in a children's hospital would result in more deaths than lives saved and would therefore reinforce the previous notion that people often died while in the hospital.

=== Professionalization of children's hospitals ===
In the 19th century, there was a societal shift in how children were viewed. This shift took away some of the parents' control and placed it in the hands of medical professionals. By the early 20th century, a child's health became increasingly tied to physicians and hospitals. This was a result of licensing acts, the formation of medical associations, and new fields of medicine being introduced across countries. New areas of medicine offered physicians the chance to build their careers by "overseeing the medical needs of private patients, caring for and trying new therapies on the sick poor, and teaching medical students." In order to raise their status further, physicians began organizing children's hospitals; by doing so, it also brought attention and importance to their speciality in the modern health care system.

Voluntary or religiously associated female care was often replaced by care provided by professionally trained nurses.

== Critiques of children's hospital care ==
Historically, many children's hospitals limited the ability of children and parents to interact, such as by limiting visiting hours. This approach was criticised for decades before shifts in practice occurred.

Surgeon James Henderson Nicholl of the Glasgow Hospital for Sick Children, who pioneered day surgery procedures such as hernia and cleft palate, stated in 1909 that: "[I]n children under 2 years of age, there a few operations indeed that cannot be as advantageously carried out in the out patient departments as in the wards." Nicholl believed that hospitalisation wasn't necessary, and children were better cared from in their own home by their parents and by nurses making daily visits. Nicholl argued that "separation from mother is often harmful".

During the interwar period, leading up to World War II, psychiatrists expressed concerns about children being away from parents, such as during hospitalisation. Harry Edelston, a psychiatrist in Leeds, detailed that children were emotionally damaged by their stay in hospital.

In the post-war era, critiques became more widespread and studies were conducted to examine potential harms. René Spitz, an Austrian-American psychoanalyst, published an article in 1945 in which he noted deleterious effects of hospitalisation, based on his research with institutionalised children.

L.A. Perry wrote a 1947 Lancet article that protested the restrictions of parental visits on hospitalized children. However, Edelston wrote in 1948, that many of this colleagues still refused to believe in hospitalisation trauma Bowlby studied 44 juvenile thieves and found that a significantly high number had experienced early and traumatic separation from their mother. In 1949, he used the data to write a report for the World Health Organization's on the mental health of homeless children in post-war Europe.

With the introduction of penicillin into the majority of the medical community by the 1940s, the major objection by doctors and nurses, that visits by parents into hospital wards introduced cross infections had been removed. A major review in 1949, over an 11-month period, showed that children admitted to 26 wards in 14 hospitals showed no correlation between visits and cross infection from parents to children. By that time, the working practices of doctors and nurses, still posed the main objection to visiting. A.D. Hunt reported that:

The hospitalised child was considered essentially a biological unit, far better off without his parents who, on weekly or bi-weekly visiting hours, were fundamentally toxic in their effect, causing noise, generally disorderly conduct, and rejection by hospital personnel.

British Psychiatrist John Bowlby, who had previously criticised World War II evacuation schemes separating parents and children, and his research assistant at the Tavistock Clinic, James Robertson, a Scottish social worker and psychoanalyst, researched the separation of young children from their parents during hospital stays and criticised the negative impacts on the children of policies of limited visiting.

By the 1950s, British politicians were concerned enough about the impact of children's hospital policy to create a committee to research the welfare of sick children in hospital. This committee produced the Platt Report of 1959, recommending that children should have more access to their parents while ill. The Report had effects on hospital care of children in the UK and New Zealand, Australia, Canada and the United States.

== Utilization in the United States ==
Using hospital discharge data from 2003 to 2011, the Agency for Healthcare Research and Quality (AHRQ) studied trends in aggregate hospital costs, average hospital costs, and hospital utilization. The Agency found that for children aged 0–17, aggregate costs rose rapidly for the surgical hospitalizations and decreased for injury hospitalizations. Further, average hospital costs, or cost per discharge, increased at least 2% for all hospitalizations and were expected to grow by at least 4% through 2013. The exception to this was mental health hospitalizations, which saw a lower percentage increase of 1.2%, and was projected to increase only 0.9% through 2013. Despite the rising aggregate costs and costs per discharge, hospitalizations (except for mental health hospitalizations) for children aged 0–17 decreased over the same time, and were projected to continue decreasing.

In 2006–2011, the rate of emergency department (ED) use in the United States was highest for patients aged under one year, but lowest for patients aged 1–17 years. The rate of ED use for patients aged under one year declined over the same time period; this was the only age group to see a decline.

Between 2008 and 2012, growth in mean hospital costs per stay in the United States was highest for patients aged 17 and younger. In 2012 there were nearly 5.9 million hospital stays for children in the United States, of which 3.9 million were neonatal stays and 104,700 were maternal stays for pregnant teens.

== Ranking ==
Every year U.S. News & World Report ranks the top children's hospitals and pediatric specialties in the United States. For the year 2010–2011, eight hospitals ranked in all 10 pediatric specialties. The ranking system used by U.S. News & World Report depends on a variety of factors. In past years (2007 was the 18th year of Pediatric Ranking), ranking of hospitals has been done solely on the basis of reputation, gauged by random sampling and surveying of pediatricians and pediatric specialists throughout the country. The ranking system used is currently under review.

== See also ==
- List of children's hospitals
- Pediatrics
- Child life specialist
- List of children's hospitals in the United States
