= James Nicol =

James Nicol, Nichol, Nicholl or Nicoll may refer to:

- James Nicol (minister) (1769–1819), Scottish poet
- James Dyce Nicol (1805–1872), Scottish politician
- James Nicol (geologist) (1810–1879), Scottish geologist
- James Henderson Nicoll (1863-1921), Scottish paediatric surgeon
- James Nicholl (1890–1955), Scottish footballer with Middlesbrough and Liverpool
- Jimmy Nichol (1903–1954), Scottish footballer with Gillingham and Portsmouth
- James Nicol (footballer, born 1909) (1909-1968), Scottish footballer with Montrose, Brechin City, Southend United, Rochdale, Crewe Alexandra. See 1934–35 Rochdale A.F.C. season
- Jimmie Nicol (born 1939), British drummer and temporary member of the Beatles
- Jimmy Nicholl (born 1956), football player and manager most known for time at Manchester United, Raith Rovers and Northern Ireland
- James Nicoll (born 1961), Usenet personality

== See also ==
- James Nicoll Morris (1763–1830), Royal Navy officer
