= Jamieson Ridge =

Ridge in the Herbert Mountains, Shackleton Range, Antarctica

Jamieson Ridge (80°27′S 25°53′W) is a narrow ridge 1 nautical mile (2 km) long, rising to about 1,200 metres (4,000 ft) at the southwestern end of the Herbert Mountains, in the Shackleton Range, Antarctica. It was photographed from the air by the U.S. Navy, 1967, and surveyed by the British Antarctic Survey, 1968–71. In association with the names of glacial geologists grouped in this area, it was named by the UK Antarctic Place-Names Committee in 1971 after Thomas F. Jamieson, a Scottish geologist whose work on the ice-worn rocks of Scotland developed the true origin of glacial striae in 1862, and who in 1865 originated the theory of isostasy.
