= Platt Report 1959 =

Report to government of the United Kingdom regarding welfare of children in hospitals

The Platt Report, officially known as Welfare of Sick Children in Hospital (Ministry of Health, 1959), was a report that was the result of research into the welfare of children who were undergoing medical treatment within the UK and to make suggestions that could be passed on to the hospital authorities that would improve their welfare during hospital visits. The report was named after Sir Harry Platt, who was the President of the Royal College of Surgeons. Platt produced the report at the behest of the Ministry of Health in the UK government. The recommendations in the Platt Report, provided the means by which a child trauma ward of a hospital should be planned for children. Established on 12 June 1956, the committee that was to produce the report defined their remit as:

To make a special study of the arrangements made in hospitals for the welfare of ill children – as distinct from the medical and nursing treatment – and to make suggestions which could be passed on to hospital authorities.

The findings of the report by the committee was that hospitals were miserable places for children, and while in hospital, they had to follow strict ward routines, and were not allowed to play. Moreover, the most grievous of the findings, was that parents were under no circumstances, allowed to visit their children outside visiting hours.

== Function ==
Membership of the report committee included two surgeons, two physicians, one nurse, and one Registered Sick Children Nurse. From its lifetime of 1956 to 1958, the committee met 20 times to consider both written and oral evidence, taken from a number of organisations including the Royal College of Physicians and Surgeons of Glasgow, Royal College of Physicians, Royal College of Nursing, the Tavistock Institute and the National Association for Maternal and Child Welfare.

The British Medical Journal confirmed in an article on 18 November 1961, that on the previous 9 November, that in reply to a question, in the House of Commons, the Minister of Health, Enoch Powell, accepted the report:

The government, with the agreement of the medical profession, accept the main principles of the report.

== Summary ==
The Platt Report recommended that children should have unfettered access to their parents while ill. The National Association for the Welfare of Children in Hospital (NAWCH) had consistently campaigned over many years for the same position, and conducted ongoing monitoring of the effects of the report. In 1982, the NAWCH conducted a survey throughout England. The survey found that progress was slowly being made and 49% of wards studied allowed unrestricted access for parents. The survey also looked at where children were being nursed and found that despite the recommendations of the Platt Report being broadly accepted by the government in 1959, 28% of children were still being nursed on adult wards. Whilst it may have been anticipated that the parents denied open access to children were those whose children were being nursed on adult wards, the survey shows that 48% of children's wards still did not have open access. The children who fared worse were children on ear, nose and throat wards with 24% being denied visits on the day of operation and with many spending up to 36 hours away from their parents.

Changes occurred rapidly from the 1980s onwards, due to a new generation of doctors and nurses who were sympathetic to the recommendations of the report. A follow-up study by NAWCH during 1986 showed great improvement, although a detailed look at changes in the interim year showed a few instances where small children's units had closed and children transferred to adult wards. The second survey was, however, on the whole very encouraging with 85% of parents having open access and another 4% of parents on open access except on operating day.

With the introduction of the Leiden charter in 1988 from the European Association for Children in Hospital that became a working framework for national paediatric organisations in Europe and the creation of the Convention on the Rights of the Child formalised the Platt report recommendations at the international level.

By 1993, a report by the Audit Commission, called Children First showed further improvements had been made, but highlighted the needs of adolescents, indicating that the Platt report recommendations had not been fully implemented.

During the first two decades of the 21st century, the re-framing of the idea of family centred care to a child-centred care approach was taking place. This approach was directly influenced by the UN convention, which in turn was driven by the Platt Report recommendations. Without the Platt Report directing policy at the national level within the United Kingdom from the 1950s onwards, it would have been unlikely these changes would have taken place. Even now, the Platt report is still considered relevant to the forming of policy that aims to improve childcare and associated services.

== Hospital visiting of sick children ==
=== 1850–1910 ===
To understand why the Platt Report was produced and put into effect, an examination of the hospitalisation of children, leading up to the mid-1950s must be made. From the 1850s to around 1910, most of the cities in the UK had built their own children's hospitals, which included a large number of prestigious hospitals, e.g. Royal Hospital for Sick Children, Glasgow, Great Ormond Street Hospital and the Royal Manchester Children's Hospital. These were independent institutions funded by voluntary donations, and from research, were shown to be designed for the "deserving poor" largely reflecting Victorian values. Children could only be admitted, if they were sponsored by a letter of recommendation, from a hospital affiliate. The "undeserving poor" were sent to workhouse infirmaries, whilst middle class children were generally cared for, and indeed operated on, at home. These hospitals set their own rules and had their own way of working, including regulating admissions, that often excluded infants and children under the age of two on humanitarian and pragmatic grounds.

The Scottish paediatrician George Armstrong, who established the first British dispensary, in 1769, was against in-patient care, i.e. hospitals for sick children. Armstrong stated:

But a very little reflection will clearly convince any thinking person that such a Scheme as this can never be executed. If you take away a sick child for its Parents or Nurse, you break its heart immediately.

Objections to admission were sometimes based on pragmatic reasons, e.g. reducing the threat of cross infection from children with diseases such as typhus, diphtheria and measles, that were a major cause of infant mortality. The voluntary nature of hospitals meant that such outbreaks were very costly. Babies and small children required more nursing care. However, by the 1880s more and more hospitals were accepting children. By the 1870s, the prevalent view among doctors and nurses was that children were better off by being removed to hospital, away from the often poor, unsanitary conditions at home.

There were enlightened people like surgeon James Henderson Nicholl of the Glasgow Hospital for Sick Children, who pioneered day surgery procedures such as Hernia and cleft palate and who stated in 1909 that:

[I]n children under 2 years of age, there a few operations indeed that cannot be as advantageously carried out in the out patient departments as in the wards.

Nicholl believed that hospitalisation wasn't necessary, and children were better cared from in their own home, both by their parents and by nurses who made daily visits to the children. Nicholl recognised that "separation from mother is often harmful". However, Nicholl's views were in the exception. For almost 50 years, whether children were in a workhouse infirmary, sanatorium or a hospital, they separated from the mothers and families and only visited, on a very strict visit schedule. By the end of the 20th century, children's hospitals had become

depersonalised scientific institutions dominations by both male and female professionals.

=== 1910–1950 ===
With the rise of behaviourism from the 1900s to the 1950s, children were rarely seen as individuals, and they became more of a collective problem to be solved. Behaviourism had many advocates, and amongst the strongest proponents of the philosophy were John B. Watson and Truby King. Watson stated the following advice regarding children:

Treat them as though they were young adults. Never hug and kiss them, never let them sit on your lap. If you must, kiss them once on the forehead when they say goodnight. Shake hands with them in the morning ... try it out ... In a week's time you will be utterly ashamed of the mawkish, sentimental way you have been handling it.

King, who promulgated a specific kind of child rearing, advocated that the child had to be breastfed, based on a strict schedule every 4 fours, not to cuddle them, and not to feed babies or children at night, lest they cried and became spoiled. King had become well known, as a child rearing expert during the interwar period, and his advice was widely accepted by the medical community. By the 1920s, hospitals were grim places for children, and only addressed the physical needs of the child, never noticing the emotional and psychological needs.

However, there were dissenting voices, both for those who had started to question the tenets of behaviourism, and those who already recognized the unique link between the child and their mother, who would nurse them in times of ill health and who always felt responsible for the child's recovery. Sir James Calvert Spence began the practice, then unique in Britain, of admitting mothers to hospital with their sick children, so that they might nurse them and feel responsible for the child's recovery. However, as a visionary, Spence was unique in this position, during that period in the 1920s, when he established his resident mother and baby unit in 1926. By the 1930s there were physicians who recognised the need, including Agnes Hunt, who introduced open visiting.

During the interwar period, leading up to World War II, research conducted by people like Harry Edelston and John Bowlby further eroded the importance and veracity of behaviourism. Edelston, a psychiatrist in Leeds, detailed that children were emotionally damaged by their stay in hospital. In 1939, John Bowlby wrote an open letter to the British Medical Journal which criticised government plans to evacuate a million children from towns and cities to the safety of the countryside. Controversially, Bowlby and his co-signatories pointed out in a letter that the psychological danger of removing children under the age of five years, from their mothers far outweighed the dangers of leaving them in cities.

Despite L.A. Perry's 1947 Lancet article, that vigorously protested the restrictions of parental visits on hospitalized children, Edelston wrote in 1948, that many of this colleagues still refused to believe in hospitalisation trauma. Bowlby would later study 44 juvenile thieves and found that a significantly high number had experienced early and traumatic separation from their mother. Bowlby would use the data in 1949 on the delinquent and affectionless children and the effects of hospitalised and institutionalised care in the commission to write a report for the World Health Organization's on the mental health of homeless children in post-war Europe.

In the late 1930s, work by René Spitz, an Austrian-American psychoanalyst, confirmed the findings by Edelston, Bowlby and Perry, specifically deleterious effects of hospitalisation, based on his research with institutionalised children.

Empirical research from both America and the United Kingdom now evidenced the premise that maternal deprivation was damaging to the child and this simple fact further challenged the tenets of Behaviourism. During interwar period, there was a growing realisation, that the ad hoc system of municipal hospitals, many that were former work house infirmaries and voluntary hospitals that provided 25% of care services, no longer provided the level of services that were needed and were no longer considered a good fit with the needs of the medical community. Indeed, by the 1930s many voluntary hospitals had already become fee-charging institutions.

During World War II, the Emergency Medical Service that was established to care for civilian casualties during war, acted as a blueprint for what a future integrated medical care service, in the UK, could look like. With the publication of the Beveridge Report in November 1942, that posited the foundation of a Welfare state as well as an integrated medical care service in the form of a National Health Service, that was subsequently established in 1948, it enabled national policy directives to be applied to the whole service. The Platt Report was one of those directives, designed in a manner, to improve the delivery of care.

=== 1950–1959 ===
With the introduction of Penicillin into the majority of the medical community by the 1940s, the major objection by doctors and nurses, that visits by parents into hospital wards introduced cross infections had been removed. A major review in 1949, over an 11-month period, showed that children admitted to 26 wards in 14 hospitals showed no correlation between visits and cross infection from parents to children. Indeed, by that time, the working practices of doctors and nurses, still posed the main objection to visiting. Hunt reported that:

The hospitalised child was considered essentially a biological unit, far better off without his parents who, on weekly or bi-weekly visiting hours, were fundamentally toxic in their effect, causing noise, generally disorderly conduct, and rejection by hospital personnel

However, the prevailing view was starting to change. John Bowlby, the British psychologist, psychiatrist, and psychoanalyst along with his research assistant at the Tavistock Clinic, James Robertson, the Scottish social worker, and psychoanalyst, started researching the separation of young children by their parents. Bowlby was the scientist who developed classic theories about maternal separation. Robertson focused his research on separation of mother and child due to hospital admission.

When Robertson first started to make observations of young children in hospital wards, he was shocked by the unhappiness he saw among the youngest children, in particular those aged under 3. The competent, efficient doctors and nurses gave good medical care but seemed unaware of the suffering around them. They saw that children initially protested at separation from the parents, but then settled, becoming quiet and compliant. However, Robertson saw this as a danger signal.

Based on several years of observations in long and short stay wards, Bowlby and Robertson formed a theory of phases of response of the under 3's to a stay in hospital without the mother: Protest, Despair and Denial/Detachment. In the protest phase, the child is visibly distressed, cries and calls for their mother. In the despair phase, the child gives up hope of his mother returning and becomes withdrawn and quiet, and may appear to be 'settling'. In the denial/detachment phase, the child shows more interest in his surroundings and interacts with others - but seems hardly to know the mother when she visits or care when she leaves. Finally, the child seems not to need any mothering at all. His relationships with others are shallow and untrusting.

Bowlby's and Robertson's research was met with hostility by the medical profession. Even their colleagues at the Tavistock Clinic, although accepting, did not feel the same sense of urgency.

In 1951, Bowlby and Robertson attempted to get their views across, by presenting to the British Paediatric Association but these views were rejected. Instead Robertson decided to take a different tack, by making a short, silent, black and white, documentary film in November 1952, called A Two-Year-Old Goes to Hospital.

Using a hand-held camera, Robertson working with his wife Joyce Robertson, a researcher, selected a little girl, called Laura, aged 2 years and 5 months, who was admitted to hospital, for the removal of tonsils, a common operation in those days. Laura was initially composed, until she realised her mother had actually left her there, and the film shows how she developed acute and continuous distress... Laura pleaded to be taken home, but as her protests and pleadings were useless, they were gradually followed by despair. She became listless, unsmiling and her traumatised emotional state was heart-rendingly clear, and on those occasions when her mother did visit during the eight days she was in hospital, Laura would turn away from her.

Robertson's film was shown to the Royal Society of Medicine on 28 November 1952, before a large audience of doctors and nurses. Donald Winnicott on seeing the film spoke of "highly successful film" that dealt with a "real problem" and evidenced the fact that he himself had seen irreversible change as a result of the separation of small children from their mothers. Both the editors of The Lancet and The BMJ discussed the meeting. The BMJ agreed that the 2-year-old girl was unhappy, and that this was in line with the findings of John Bowlby. The Lancet stated that the audience frankly refused to admit that the child was distressed and were reluctant to believe that it might cause long term damage. Robertson's memory of the meeting, was that "it was if we had dropped a bomb in the hall" and that "the film encountered much resistance and rejection". The speakers also supposedly also said that Robertson "had slandered paediatrics and the film should be withdrawn". Two people who were at the meeting were Donald Winnicott and Sister Ivy Morris from Amersham Hospital and they agreed to a second filming on their ward. Robertson later took film and viewed it to American paediatricians in 1953, but curiously American audiences confirmed that the film findings were applicable to British children, but they did not apply to American children, and were perhaps less cared for and protected in an overindulgent way, and were, therefore, less upset at being separated from their parent. However, Robertson's subsequent research in the United States merely confirmed his findings, and showed that on both sides of the Atlantic, there were those who were in favour of unrestricted visiting, and those who were not. Robertson eventually viewed the film to paediatricians and other healthcare professionals in the United Kingdom, France, Denmark, Netherlands, Norway and Yugoslavia. Robertson noticed that younger professionals were more accepting of the evidence, while senior professionals tended to reject the film. Robertson's successor film was called, Going to Hospital with Mother. Robertson chose Amersham Hospital specifically, as every mother of a child under 5 years was invited to come into residence in the hospital, without discriminating between good mothers and over-anxious mothers. Bowlby and Robertson created a film, which was more about the study of human relationship, and showed how children responded differently to treatment when mother was present and how the staff of one hospital had created a way of admitting the mother with the child without making structural changes to the ward. The second film was based on Sally, who is 20 months old, and is lively and funny. When attending hospital for a minor operation, she arrives with her mother. When the surgeon calls, Sally protests, but with her mother there, her protest is brief. The film follows Sally throughout the hospital visit with her mother present throughout. When Sally returns home, she has none of the attendant disturbed behaviour of those who have been in hospital without their mother. Even though the film was shown widely, the pace of progress was still glacial. Indeed, The Lancet reported in 1956, that only 10% of hospital now restricted visiting, even though the Minister of Health Robin Turton was repeatedly asking for changes.

==== Platt report ====
The glacial process resulted in pressure being brought to bear by both James and Joyce Robertson with other doctors and parents against the medical establishment, and resulted in Robin Turton commissioning the Central Health Services Council, that was part of the Ministry of Health, to establish a committee to undertake a special study of the arrangements made in hospital for children and the very young and to make recommendations to those hospitals, in the form of a report. The Terms of Reference for the production of the report was:

To make a special study of the arrangements made in hospital for the welfare of children – as distinct from their medical and nursing treatment - and to make suggestions which could be passed on to the hospital authorities.

The report was commissioned on 12 June 1956. Sir Harry Platt, who was a former president of the Royal College of Surgeons of England was chosen to be Chairman of the committee. The committee met 20 times to take evidence from both sides of the debate in a manner that was scrupulously fair. Both parents and health professionals as well as children's organisations including charities gave evidence. The Association of British Paediatric Nurses provided evidence to the contrary, arguing for the status quo, that frequent visitors brought infection into the ward. Both James Robertson and John Bowlby also provided evidence. James Robertson appeared in front of the committee with Dermod MacCarthy to show his film A Two-Year-Old Goes to Hospital, but upon requesting the BBC to show the film nationally, were refused, as the BBC had consulted medical opinion, which agreed that the film would cause anxiety to parents. However, the evidence provided by James and Joyce Robertson was extremely influential to the final recommendations of the report. The final report was sent to Lord Cohen of Birkenhead, Chair of the Central Health Services Council on 28 October 1958.

The Platt Report was made up of four sections, dealing with preparation for admission, admission procedure, in-patient care and patient discharge, respectively. The Report had profound and lasting effects on the welfare of children, not only with the United Kingdom, but in other countries like New Zealand, Australia, Canada and the United States. The main recommendations of the report were:

- Hospitals should have a separate children's outpatients department or a separate waiting room in an adult department or casualty department. Children and adolescents should not be nursed on an adult ward. There should be facilities for inside and outside play. Each nursing team should include a sick children's nurse and the child should have access to other staff such as social worker, occupational therapist and nursery nurses.
- Prior to admission there should be hospital open days allowing families to have preparatory talks with hospital staff. Hospital leaflets and letters should be available. GP's and health visitors should give explanations and reassurances to children and families.
- Whilst in hospital, children should be allowed to keep their personal possessions and wear their own clothes. Children should have access to education. Admission of mothers should be considered in the first few days for children under 5 years of age. There should be unrestricted visiting from parents, at reasonable hours of the day and there should be facilities for visitors such as playrooms for siblings and a canteen. Parents should be kept informed of their child's progress by both nursing and medical staff.
- Unpleasant medical techniques should be kept to the minimum. There should be separate treatment and recovery rooms so other children do not witness distressing procedures. Parents should be present at recovery of anaesthesia. Discussions between medical staff should be kept to the minimum in front of children.
- Children with special needs may need more in the way of pre-admission preparation. There should have access to any special equipment that is necessary. They should be taught by children who have specialist skills or can access such expertise.
- On discharge from hospital, parents should be warned about behavioural problems that may arise at home, and how to get advice on how to deal with them. General practitioners should be informed in advance and sent as full a report as possible.
- Doctors, nurses and other staff who care for children should be given training about the emotional needs of children in hospital, and how to adjust their procedures to suit children.

=== 1959–1980 Post Platt ===
During the twenty years after the Platt Report, parents wanting to visit their sick child who were formerly excluded, moved to parents being tolerated by the medical community when they wanted to visit their sick child and this was a break from what could be considered tradition and a move towards a more humanitarian viewpoint. James Robertson continued to research the problem and to share his findings. He wrote four influential articles for The Observer and The Guardian newspapers to disseminate his ideas, and the issue started to gain traction. In 1961, the BBC agreed to show excerpts of A Two-Year-Old Goes to Hospital and his other films and Robertson gave a live introduction to the films and asked parents to submit their experiences of hospital care to him. The stories Robertson received from the parents were published in 1962 in a book called Hospitals and Children: A Parent's-Eye View. Harry Platt himself wrote the foreword to book.

Jane Thomas, a young mother living in Battersea, contacted Robertson to ask what she would do if her own child was hospitalised, and Robertson suggested forming an organisation, which Thomas and a group of women did. The organisation was called the Mother Care for Children in Hospital and was founded in 1961. Thomas sent a letter to The Guardian detailing her experiences, and the responses allowed the organisation to grow and campaign for the full implementation of the report. Soon regional groups appeared all over the UK and these amalgamated in 1963, and became the National Association for the Welfare of Children in Hospital (NAWCH) in 1965. Although the Platt Report was accepted by the Ministry of Health and government, they were under no legal obligation to implement the report. In this manner, the NAWCH became a pressure and advocate group, applying pressure both on the government and the nursing profession, which throughout the 1960s and 1970s continued to resist the new recommendations, and advocating for sick children and their families. The NAWCH developed a series of techniques to get hospitals to relax their strict rules. One of these techniques was carrying out surveys of all hospitals, which found that although the hospital said they allowed unrestricted visiting, the reality would be different. One hospital reported they allowed unrestricted visiting, "but not in the mornings". Another stated, that "It was the aim of the board of Governors to have unrestricted visiting, as long as the parents understand that they can't be in the wards all the time." Otorhinolaryngology wards were particularly bad, often getting parents to sign a consent form, that made them agree not to visit the child on the day of operation. Another technique was to recruit sympathetic doctors and nurses who could advocate for change. The NAWCH drew attention to these practices by issuing press releases detailing their findings and providing leaflets to parents when visiting hospitals that allowed unrestricted visits, telling them of this fact. By 1969, a NAWCH survey of 67 hospitals showed that only 57% allowed unrestricted visiting. The same picture emerged regarding the results of survey of 636 hospitals in the United States, reporting only 62% allowed unrestricted visiting.

With a desire to seek a more benevolent approach to the care of children in hospital, changes occurred that led to a broader trend within the development work. In Toronto, the Hospital for Sick Children was at the forefront of this approach, when it introduced a blueprint to enable parents to care for their children. The kind of approach developed in Toronto was called Rooming-in, and described a hospital unit at St. Michael's Hospital in Toronto, where both the mother and father look after their newborn baby in a room where both mother and baby are cared for together. The Rooming-in concept as a philosophy of family centred care was later adopted in Canada. A good example of this was developed at McMaster University in 1969, in building a new Health Science Centre. Nursing staff arranged visits to specialised facilities for the architects of the centre, enabling the nursing unit and nursery design to be changed to incorporate the Rooming-in concept to be adopted at the centre. In the 1960s, the Care-by-parents model was being developed with the first unit developed and established in Lexington, Kentucky. In these Care-by-parents units, parents would live with their sick child. This model was developed to both safe money and quality of care, under the supervision of a nurse. The Care-by-parents room was designed with en-suite facilities. Coffee and tea making machines were provided with laundry facilities. In these units, parents were taught to care for their child and were particularly beneficial for babies who were being breast fed. For that model, the role and expectations of the parents were outlined on admission. In findings by Clearly et al. in a structured observational study, found that children in these units spent less time alone, slept less and cried less. In contrast those children outwith the units, spent time with an ever-changing group of nurses, spent more time alone, spent more time sleeping and cried more. For chronically ill or handicapped children, the benefits of these units were more apparent in terms of shorter and fewer visits. The study noted that where a care by parent option could be introduced into a paediatric unit, it had a distinct social and psychological advantages for the children in hospital as well as longer term benefits. In a 1968 study by Brain and Maclay's in the University Hospital of Wales in the United Kingdom, 197 children who underwent tonsillectomy and adenoidectomy were split into three control groups. The study found that children without a resident parent did sleep more than the others, children who in the scheme cried less in total than the others outside it, and that nursing staff spent less time with the care by the parent group than with the others despite the demands of teaching and support. It also found that children who were accompanied by their mother had significantly lower rates of post-operative complications, including infection and emotional distress, than those who were unaccompanied. However, nurses involved in the study still preferred the children to be admitted on their own, but also admitted that mothers were a great help to their children, but felt it was much easier to carry out the medical procedure when the child was left on their own, which enabled the nurse to have a closer contact with the child. Research also showed, that 4% of mothers were difficult to handle by the nursing staff

The seminal report by Pamela Hawthorn, published in 1974 and called Nurse, I want my mummy! changed the face of patient care in the UK. Commenting on the report in the BBC article, Professor Martin Johnson, professor of nursing at the University of Salford, stated of the report that:

Pamela's study was done against the background of a lively debate in paediatrics and psychology as to the degree women should spend with children in the outside world and the degree to which they should be allowed to visit children in hospital... Of course we know now that they had almost given up hope that mum was ever coming back....But children were alone and depressed so Hawthorn said parents should be allowed to visit.

Hawthorn investigated nursing care in 11 hospitals, used qualified nurses who asked questions from standardised questionnaires to gather the research, and found that unrestricted nursing times ranged from the full days access to just a few hours a day. In wards that recognised and implemented Platt's recommendations, it was found that children were less likely to be lonely or miserable. The most important finding from the study and what prevented the widespread uptake of Platt's recommendations was the lack of Registered Sick Children's Nurses (RSCN) on the wards. Hawthorn's report found that only 575 RSCN nurses were being trained annually in the 1960s and 1970s, which was insufficient to ensure that every children's emotional and psychological needs were being addressed properly while in ward.

=== 1980–2009 Shift to parental participation ===
By the 1980s, it was obvious to observers that the situation was changing with respect to the ability of parents to visit their sick children in hospital and care for them. Pressure groups like the National Association for the Welfare of Children in Hospital worked tirelessly to push back the boundaries of care, and influenced the development of advocacy in the wider social contract. In 1982, an NAWCH survey was conducted that looked at access on children's wards throughout England by Rosemary Thornes. The report found that 49% of wards studied allowed unrestricted access for parents. The report looked at where children were being nursed and found that despite what the Platt Report recommended, 28% of children were still being nursed on adult wards, and that 48% of children's wards still did not have open access. The children who fared worse were those on the otorhinolaryngology wards, with 24% being denied visits on the day of the visit, with many children spending up to 36 hours away from their parents. It was clear that attitudes were changing as a new generation of doctors and nursings arrived, that naturally accepted the findings of the Platt report, but were stymied by outdated processes, infrastructure and traditional attitudes.

In 1984, the National Association for the Welfare of Children in Hospital decided to issue a charter to reflect their values and in order to raise the quality of services for children. Jenny Davison of the NAWCH wrote that it was "formulated by procedures which have become a model for later standard setting". The charter was constructed of 10 principles, with e.g. principle 2 stating that "Children in hospital shall have the right to have their parents with them at all times. (with caveats)". Principle 3 stated that it was the child had the "right to information appropriate to age and understanding". The charter was approved by the Royal College of Nursing (RCN) and the British Paediatric Association (RCPCH). The Sainsbury report,

A study by the NAWCH in 1986 showed huge improvements in the proportion of wards with entirely unrestricted access for parents with 85% of wards allowing open access to parents, but estimated that only 67% of parents were welcomed, and 24% only accepted and 9% only tolerated. The study report also stated that where small children's units had been closed, the children had been transferred into adult wards. The 1988 study by Rosemary Thornes, for the NAWCH, supported by the RCN and the RCPCH recommended that all parents under the age of five years should be offered overnight accommodation.

During the 1980s, the medical community continued to research the problem domain, identifying the benefits of parents caring for their children both with the UK and internationally. The Keane report, 1986, found that a number of resident parents in hospital perceived their children as temperamentally vulnerable, and needed special reassurance and explanation. The Sainsbury report, 1986, found that nurses believed that their work role was enhanced, and that most parents coped with caring duties, and were grateful for being considered important in the process of healing. International research focused on different aspects of parent-child care. A Canadian report of 1983, by Evans and Robinson focused on the economic aspects of care-by-parent units by a parent's stay on the ward can reduce costs by resuming nursing tasks, limiting unnecessary procedures, and encouraging early discharge An American report by Stull and Deatrick in 1986, tried to find a methodology for measuring the effectiveness of parental participation in the care of the hospitalized child. The process used was for 24 parents to be tested with 11 parental involvement activities and the research submitted to 19 experts for analysis. The 11 categories were then to subject to metrics to identify their effectiveness of focus on the activity. An Irish report in 1989, by Taylor and Connor also looked at the reduction in costs associated with parents caring for their child in hospital. The report found that hospital visits were 31% shorter than those whose parents were not resident, representing a shorter stay in hospital, and a saving as well as meeting the needs of the child, including less emotionally disturbing time spent in hospital visits.

Although research was being conducted in the 1980s to explore the different benefits of parents caring for their children both within hospital, within the community and at home, and were wholly accepting of the Platt report, the British government had a restored focus on the needs of both young and adolescent children, due to a number of sentinel events, that occurred during the late 1980s and early 1990s with the Platt Report being referred to during proceedings. This resulted in the UK government allocating additional funding to train more Registered Sick Children's Nurse's (RSCN). This one action sped up efforts to achieve the full implementation of the Platt Report in the UK.

In the international stage, events were occurring that were progressing both the implementation and acceptance of the Platt report recommendations. The European Association for Children in Hospital (EACH), was an umbrella association representing a number of member associations involved in the welfare of all children in Europe. In 1988, twelve of the member associations of EACH met in Leiden and created a charter, based on the recommendations of the Platt report and the charter created in 1984 by the Action for Sick Children charity, the new name of the NAWCH. The NAWCH changed names in 1990. The Leiden Charter, as it was colloquially named, became a working framework for the national associations that were part of the EACH. The Leiden charter consisted of 10 points. and was eventually ratified by 16 European countries and Japan.

Other events were taking place at the same frame as Leiden charter. The United Nations Convention on the Rights of the Child was ratified by the UK 16 December 1991, and most of the rest of the world as well, except the United States. Somalia was the last state to finally ratify it in January 2015. The convention not only dealt with the specific needs and rights of children, but also decided that states must act under the principle of best interests of the child, specifically in this context of not being separated from their parents. Signers are bound under international law. That is defined under Article 3 of the convention.

=== 2010-2026 ===
During the first two decades of the 21st century, the re-framing of the idea of family centred care to a child-centred care (CCC) approach was taking place.

The child centred approach is an evolution of family centred care, but neither approach can exclude the other, with CCC recognising the critical importance of parents. The recognition of the idea of the child as active member and equal, meant the child was to be included in the care partnership, defining a conceptual relationship as "child in family" rather than "child and family". The relationship was not "either/or" but "either/and".

The child-centred approach is cognizant of the fact that the child has their own ideas and can make choices, that are in the best interest of the themselves, i.e. being an active member in the partnership. Recent research has shown that children are capable of learning skills as healthcare members, the ability to effectively communicate with both health professionals and parents, defining goals, and using decisions to get the best possible outcome.

Although agreement on the definition of child centred care has proven elusive, some principles of the approach have been defined

- Consider the "whole child", not simply the illness or condition.
- Treat children as children and young people as young people.
- Be concerned with the overall experience of the child and the family
- Treat children, young people and parents as partners in care.
- Integrate and coordinate services around the child's and families particular needs.
- Graduate smoothly into adult service at the right time
- Work in partnership with children, young people and parents to plan and shape service and develop the workforce.

For much of the 20th century, healthcare has been one of the many contexts in which the child has been disenfranchised, and denied their right to participation in their own care. With the release of the Platt report, this slowly changed, until family centred and later child centred care became well understood. However, even now the full recommendations of the Platt report have not been implemented. For example, where similar standards are in place, the co-location of children within adult wards is common.

== Bibliography ==
- Thornes, Rosemary (1983). "Parental Access And Family Facilities In Children's Wards In England". British Medical Journal (Clinical Research Edition). 287 (6386): 190–192. doi:10.1136/bmj.287.6386.190. JSTOR 29511618. PMC 1548684. PMID 6409247.
- Parents staying overnight with their children in hospital : research and report., Rosemary Thornes; Caring for Children in the Health Services (Group). London:Caring for Children in the Health Services, 1988. (NAWCH)
- Evans, RG; Robinson, GC (August 1983). "An economic study of cost savings on a care-by-parent ward". Medical Care. 21 (8): 768–82. doi:10.1097/00005650-198308000-00002. PMID 6888029. S2CID 22428531.
- Keane, S.; Garralda, M.E.; Keen, J.H. (January 1986). "Resident parents during paediatric admissions". International Journal of Nursing Studies. 23 (3): 247–253. doi:10.1016/0020-7489(86)90022-2. PMID 3637162.
- Sainsbury, C P; Gray, O P; Cleary, J; Davies, M M; Rowlandson, P H (1 June 1986). "Care by parents of their children in hospital". Archives of Disease in Childhood. 61 (6): 612–615. doi:10.1136/adc.61.6.612. PMC 1777832. PMID 3729534.
- Taylor, M R; O'Connor, P (1 February 1989). "Resident parents and shorter hospital stay". Archives of Disease in Childhood. 64 (2): 274–276. doi:10.1136/adc.64.2.274. PMC 1791867. PMID 2930234.
- Stull, Maryk.; Deatrick, Janet A. (10 July 2009). "Measuring Parental Participatiun: Part I". Issues in Comprehensive Pediatric Nursing. 9 (3): 157–165. doi:10.3109/01460868609029852. PMID 3635501.

Report

- "The Platt Report". BMJ. 2 (5245): 159. 15 July 1961. doi:10.1136/bmj.2.5245.159. PMC 1969166. PMID 20789190.
