= Glen Roy =

Nature reserve in the Highlands of Scotland with ancient shoreline terraces

Glen Roy National Nature Reserve
- IUCN category III (natural monument or feature)
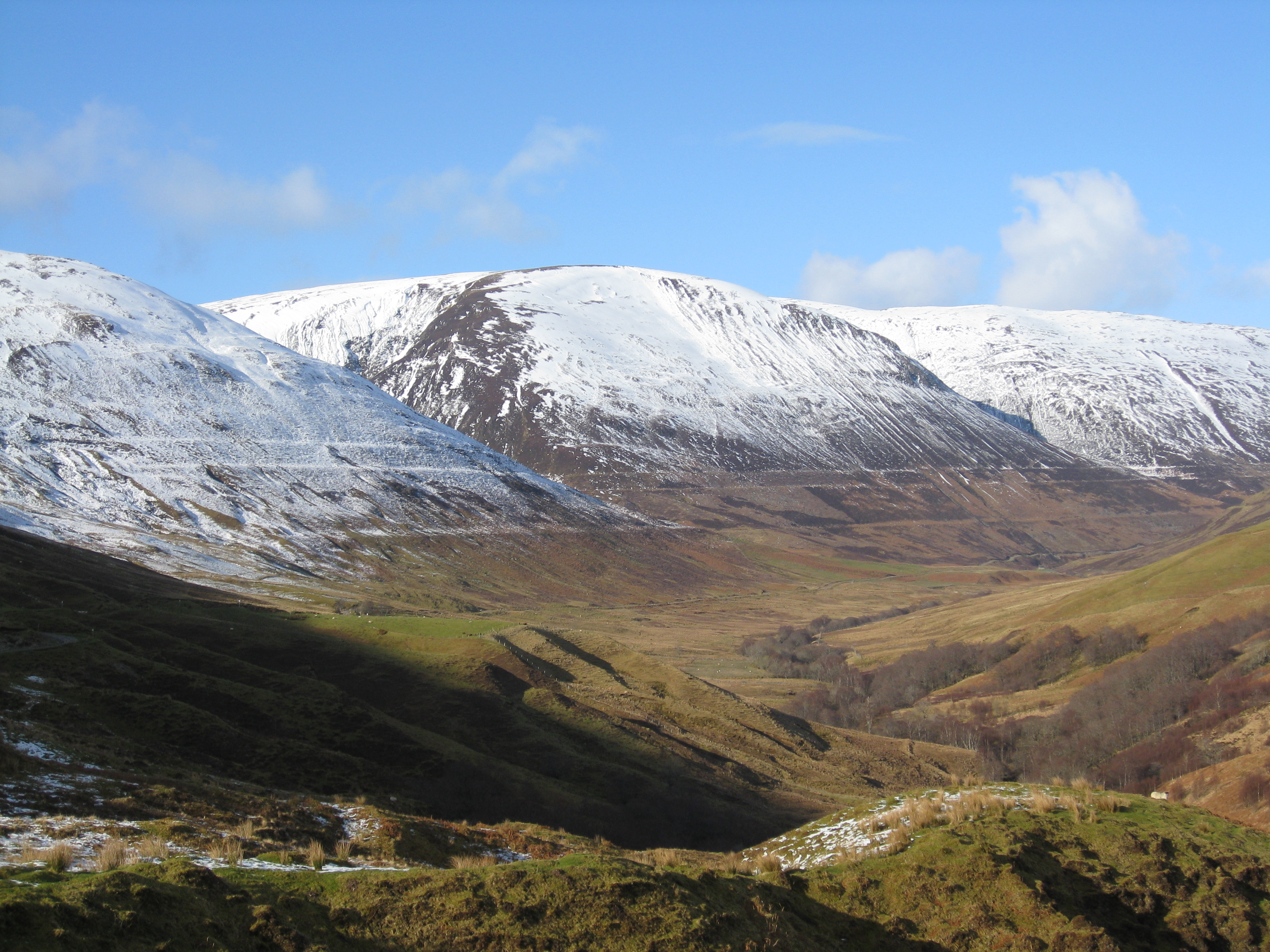
- The Parallel Roads of Glen Roy, highlighted by recent snowfall

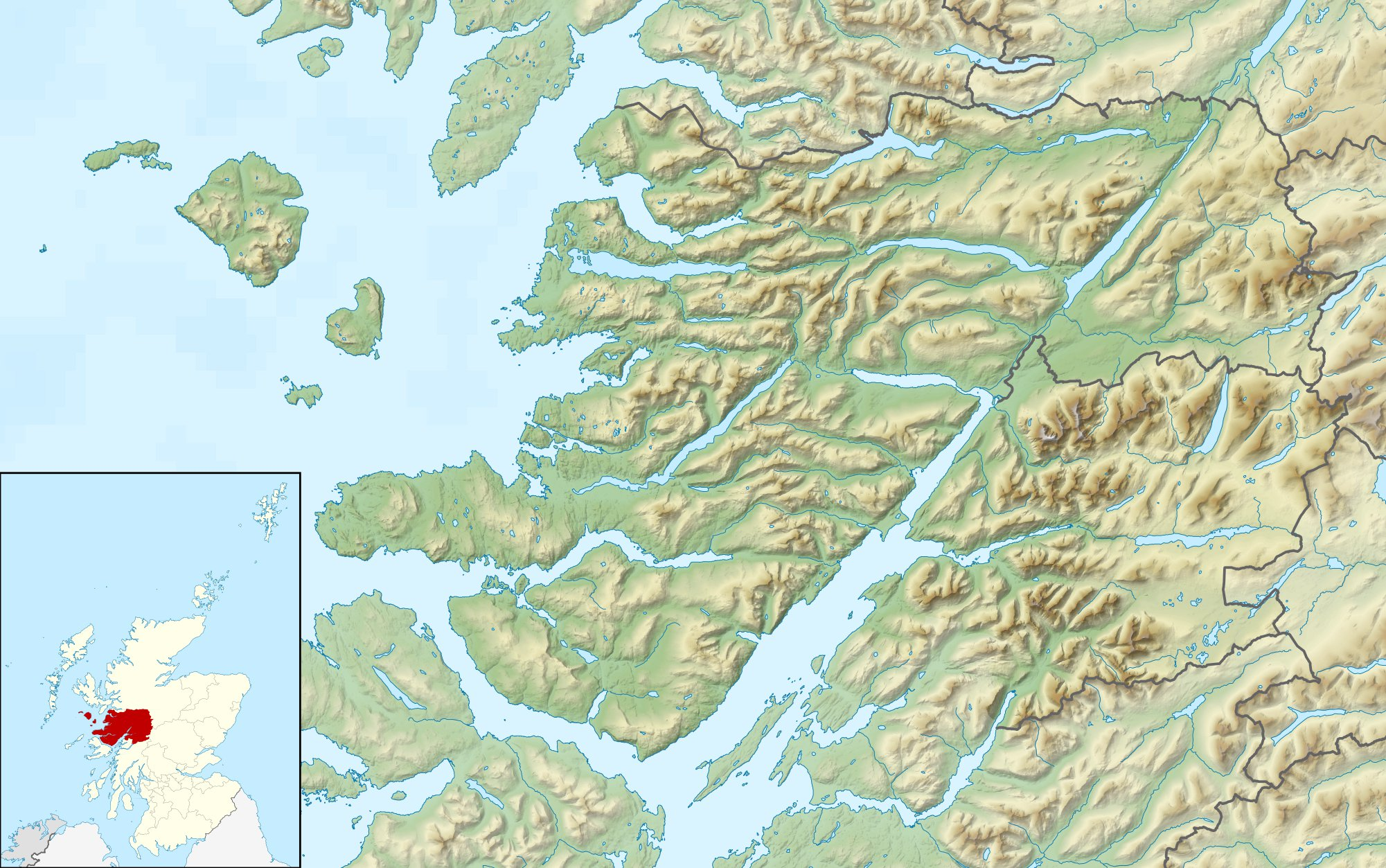
- Location within Lochaber
- Location: Roybridge, Lochaber, Scotland
- Coordinates: 56.97°N 4.76°W
- Area: 1,168.3 ha (4.511 sq mi)
- Established: 1970
- Governing body: NatureScot
- Website: Glen Roy National Nature Reserve

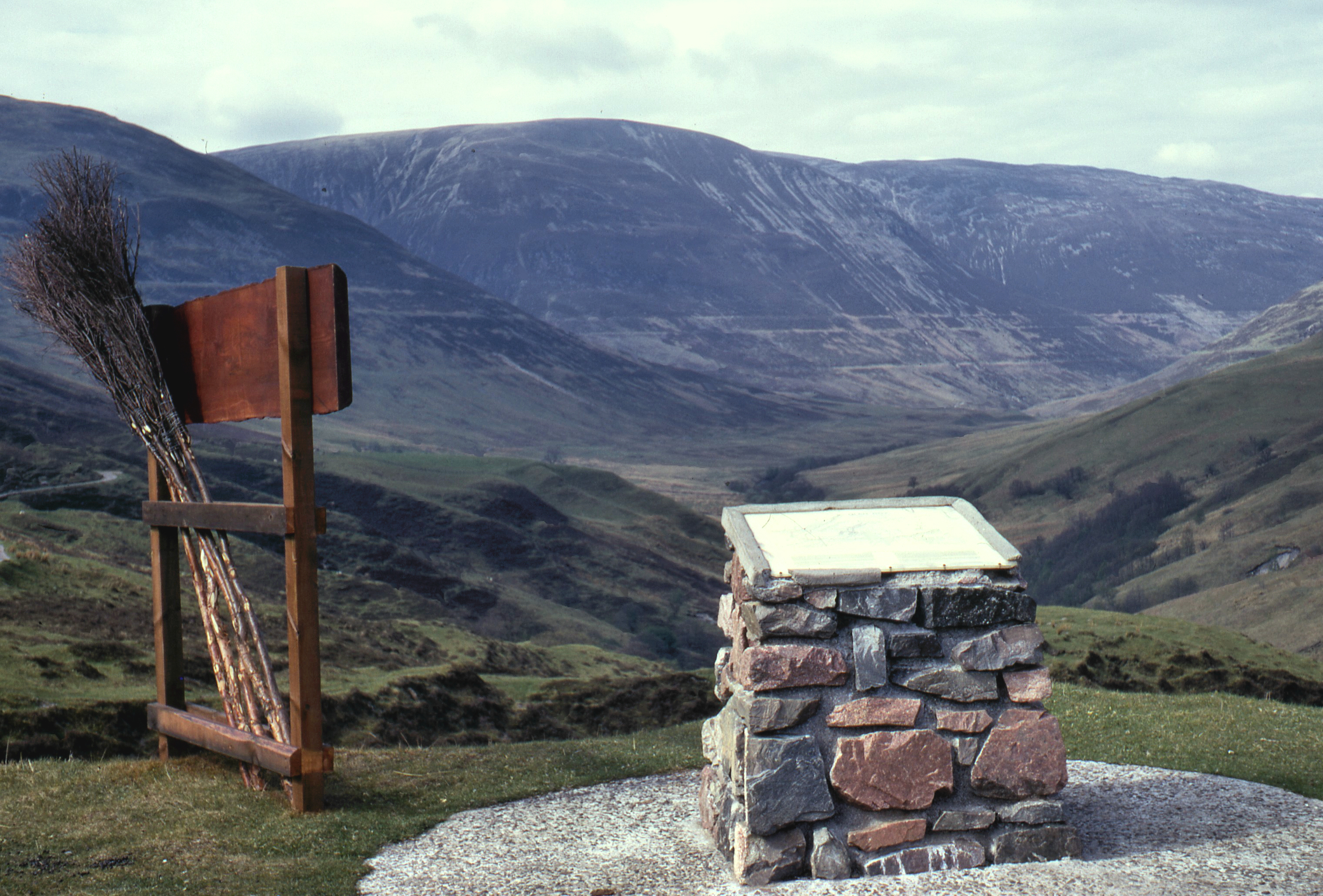
The Parallel Roads and Glen Roy

Glen Roy (Scottish Gaelic: Gleann Ruaidh, meaning "red glen") in the Lochaber area of the Highlands of Scotland is a glen noted for the geological phenomenon of three loch terraces known as the Parallel Roads of Glen Roy. The terraces formed along the shorelines of an ancient ice-dammed loch that existed during a brief period (some 900–1,100 years in duration) of climatic deterioration, during a much longer period of deglaciation, subsequent to the last main ice age (the Devensian). From a distance they resemble man-made roads running along the side of the glen, hence the name. Much of the glen is designated as a national nature reserve.

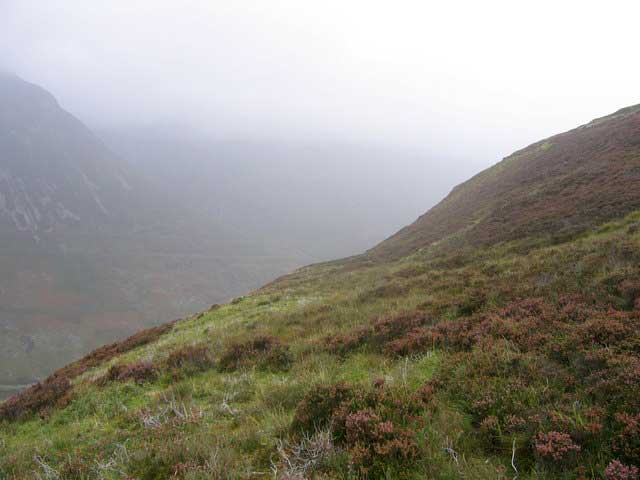
One of the Parallel Roads, showing the change in the slope of the hillside at the ancient shoreline.

Glen Roy runs north from Glen Spean which takes the main A86 trunk road and the railway of the West Highland Line, both running about a further 23 kilometres (14 mi) southwest via Spean Bridge to Fort William. The village of Roybridge and Roy Bridge railway station are sited where the River Roy joins the River Spean, and from there a narrow single-track road runs north up the glen for almost 16 kilometres (10 mi) to Brae Roy Lodge.

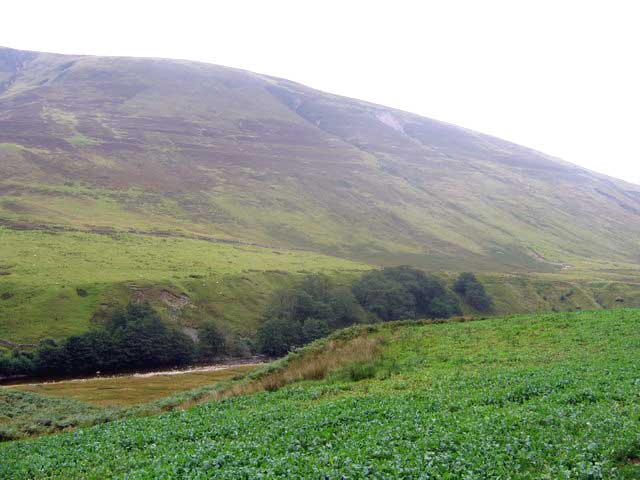
View across the glen to the Parallel Roads

== The Parallel Roads of Glen Roy ==
The Parallel Roads of Glen Roy, Scottish Highlands, represent a series of ice-dammed proglacial lake shorelines produced during the cold climate of the Younger Dryas (GS1). It has been demonstrated by Dawson, Hampton, Harrison, Greengrass and Fretwell (2002) that each lake shoreline exhibits evidence of glacio-isostatic tilting associated with the decay of the last (Late Devensian) ice sheet. The directions of tilting of the three shorelines (in the quadrant between north and east), are at variance with published glacio-isostatic uplift isobases based on marine shoreline data that suggest a pattern of decreased uplift towards the northwest. The gradient of shoreline tilting (between 0.11 and 0.14 m/km) is similar to measured regional tilts of a well-developed marine shoreline (the Main Rock Platform) considered to have been produced in Scotland during the same period of extreme cold climate. Consideration of the ice-dammed lake shoreline data also points to the former occurrence of two separate episodes of tectonic activity during the Younger Dryas (Greenland Stadial 1 - GS1).

== Historic geological investigations ==
In the 19th century, the Parallel Roads attracted the attention of many early geologists, including the Reverend William Buckland, Charles Lyell, James Nicol, Charles Babbage, James Geikie, and Joseph Prestwich. This interest ensured that the Parallel Roads featured prominently in the development of geological science.

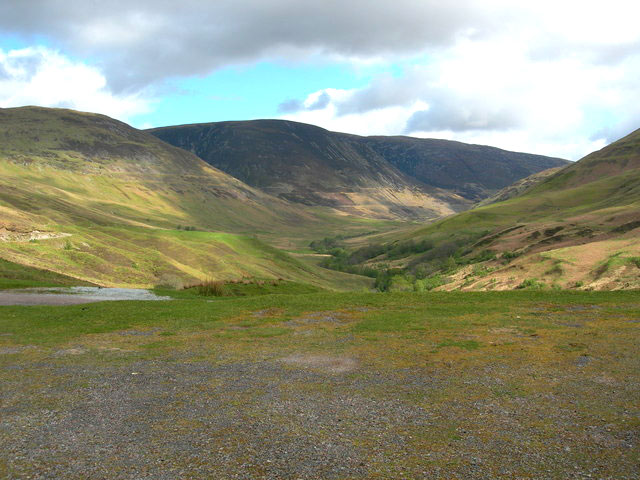
A viewpoint on the single track road, looking north up the glen.

Charles Darwin visited the glen in June 1838 and, drawing on his recent findings in South America during the Beagle expedition concluded that the shorelines were raised beaches of marine origin. His paper on the subject was published in 1839 in the Philosophical Transactions of the Royal Society. This was contradicted in 1840 by Louis Agassiz's Glacial theory which postulated that the Glen Roy shorelines had been cut by freeze-thaw processes of loch ice during the maximum extent of glacial ice in the climatic reversal known as the Younger Dryas / Greenland Stadial, or locally the Loch Lomond Readvance. Darwin defended his paper over many years.

In 1861 Thomas Jamieson was advised by Lyell and Darwin about visiting the Glen, and given memoranda and maps by Darwin. After visiting the glen a second time in the summer of 1862, Jamieson wrote to Lyell on 15 August reporting his findings. On 6 September Darwin told Lyell and Jamieson that he was convinced: "My paper is one long gigantic blunder". Jamieson's paper on his investigations was published in 1863. Four decades after Darwin's 1839 paper and shortly before his death, in a letter to Joseph Prestwich, he said that he gave up his Glen Roy theory when he read T. F. Jamieson's (1863) paper but he agreed with Prestwich's criticism of Jamieson's interpretation of the Glen Turret delta.

Interest in the Parallel Roads continues to this day, both among earth scientists intrigued by the dramatic processes that shaped that landscape, and among tourists attracted by the natural wonder of the landforms.

== Conservation designations ==
Glen Roy is a national nature reserve (NNR), managed by NatureScot. Glen Roy was acquired by the then Nature Conservancy in 1970 and declared a national nature reserve in order to protect the site against proposed afforestation. Whilst Glen Roy is also protected as a Site of Special Scientific Interest (SSSI), at that time this accolade offered much weaker protection than it does today. Protection now comes from both its SSSI and NNR status. The NNR is designated a Category III protected area by the International Union for Conservation of Nature. Glen Roy is also defined as one of the core areas of the Lochaber Geopark.

== The Glen Roy Lifting Stones ==
A pair of historic lifting stones can be found in Glen Roy these are 137kg (The 'Grey Mountain') and 133kg (Sister Red). The exact location is as follows: an example of a full shoulder lift can be seen here:
