= James Nicol (geologist) =

Scottish geologist (1810–1879)

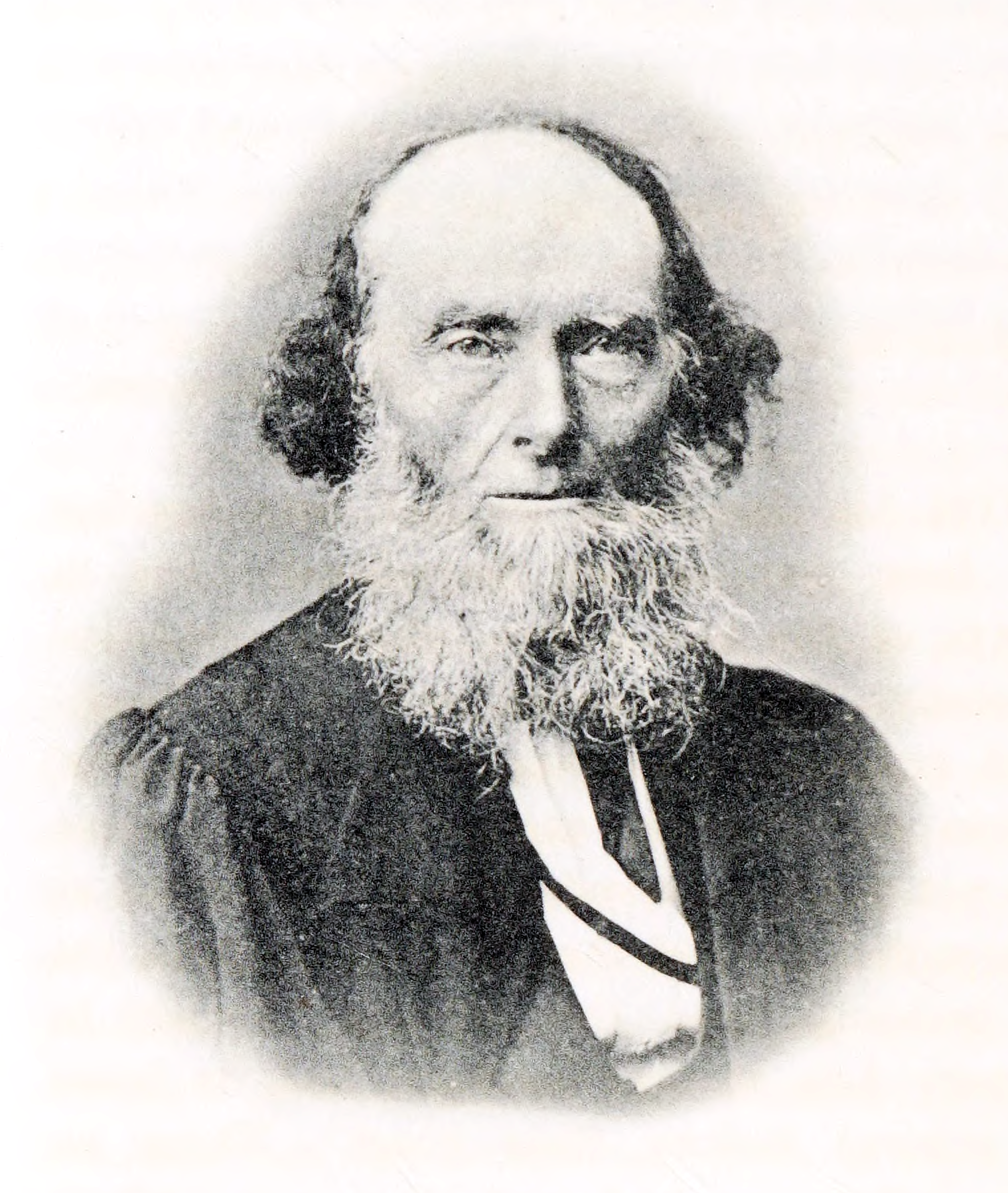
James Nicol

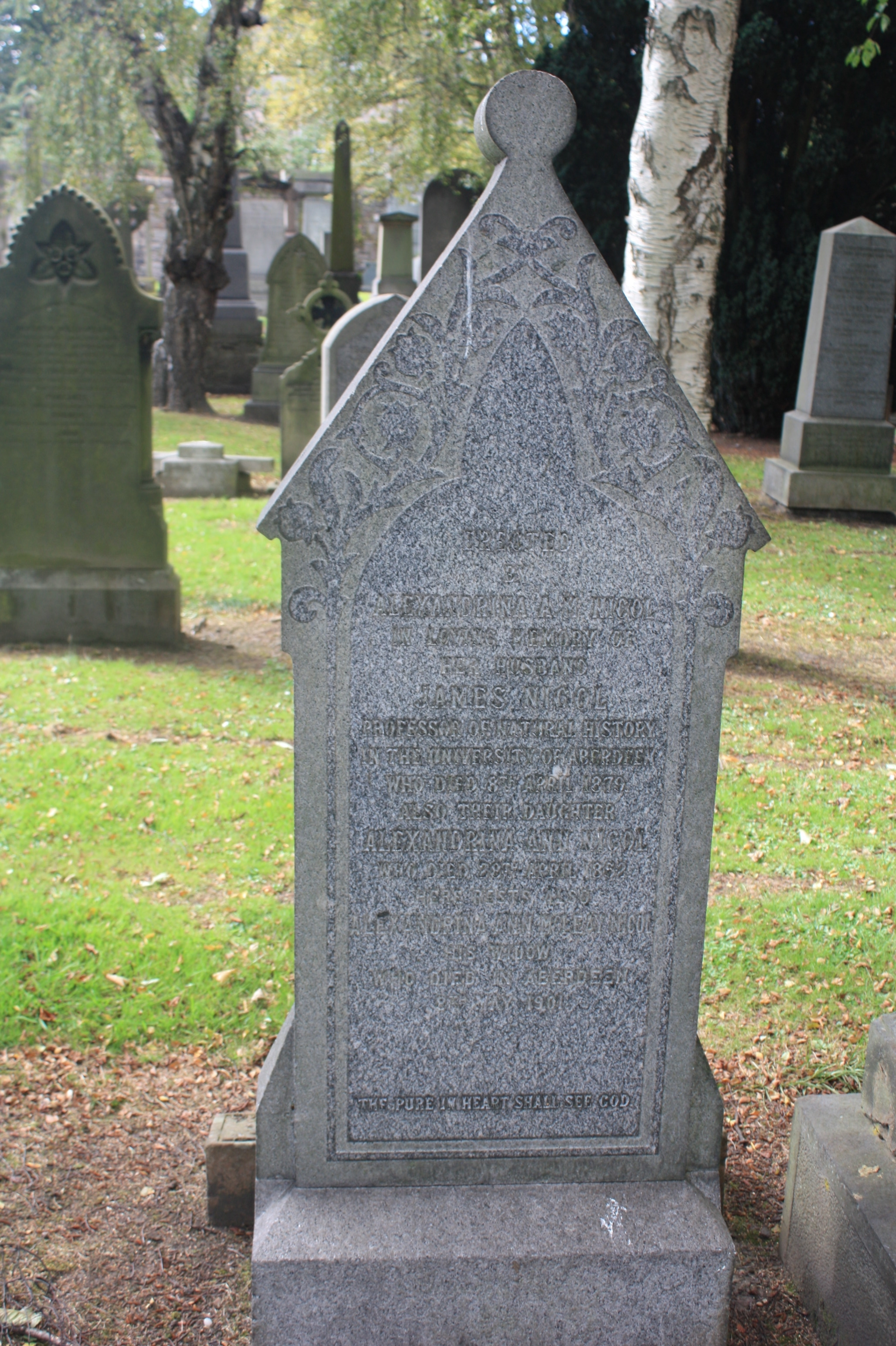
The grave of Prof James Nicol, Grange Cemetery

James Nicol FRSE FGS (12 August 1810 – 8 April 1879) was a Scottish geologist.

== Life ==
He was born at Traquair, near Innerleithen in Peeblesshire, the son of Rev. James Nicol (1769–1819), and his wife Agnes Walker. He studied Arts and Divinity at Edinburgh University from 1825. He also attended the lectures of Robert Jameson, having gained a keen interest in geology and mineralogy. He further pursued these studies in the universities of Bonn and Berlin.

After returning home Nicol worked at local geology and obtained prizes from the Highland Society for essays on the geology of Peeblesshire and Roxburghshire, now areas of the Scottish Borders. He subsequently extended his researches over other parts of Scotland, and in 1844 published Guide to the Geology of Scotland.

In 1847 Nicol was appointed assistant secretary to the Geological Society of London, being appointed a Fellow of the Society in the same year. He was also elected a Fellow of the Royal Society of Edinburgh his proposer being George Wilson.

In 1849 professor of geology in Queen's College, Cork, and in 1853 professor of natural history in the University of Aberdeen, a post which he retained until a few months before he died. In his later years he lived at 15 Bon Accord Square in Aberdeen.

He was buried with his wife and daughter in the north-west section of Grange Cemetery in Edinburgh.

== Family ==
In 1849 he married Alexandrina Anne Macleay Downie.

== Works ==
Nicol carried out researches on the Southern Uplands of Scotland and on the structure of the Highlands. In the former region he gave the first clear account of the succession of the fossiliferous Lower Palaeozoic rocks (1848–1852). When he came to deal with the still older Highland rocks he made out the position of the Torridonian sandstone and Durness limestone, and their relations to the schists and gneisses. Nichol's mature views, although recognising the fallacy in the extant theory of Roderick Murchison, were subsequently superseded by the theory of Charles Lapworth which was corroborated by Benjamin Peach and John Horne. Nicol criticised Thomas Jamieson's explanation of the Parallel Roads of Glen Roy. Jamieson considered that the features were shorelines of a fresh water lake trapped behind a glacier; Nicol maintained that the 'overflow cols' show no indications of a water torrent; he concluded that they were sea-straits and therefore the 'roads' were of marine origin.

The more important of his papers were:

- "On the Structure of the North-Western Highlands" (Quart. Journ, Geol. Soc., 1861), pp. 85–113
- "On the Geological Structure of the Southern Grampians" (ib., 1863), pp. 180–207

He contributed the article "Mineralogy" to the ninth edition of the Encyclopædia Britannica. Among his other works were:

- An Historical and Descriptive Account of Iceland, Greenland, and the Faroe Islands (1840)
- Manual of Mineralogy (1849)
- Elements of Mineralogy (1858, 2nd ed., 1873)
- Geological Map of Scotland (1858)
- Geology and Scenery of the North of Scotland (1866).
- Nicol, J.(1869) On the Origin of the Parallel Roads of Glen Roy. (Quart. Journ. Geol. Soc. 25), pp. 282–291.
