= Tulloch railway station =

Railway station in the Highlands of Scotland

Tulloch Scottish Gaelic: Tulaich
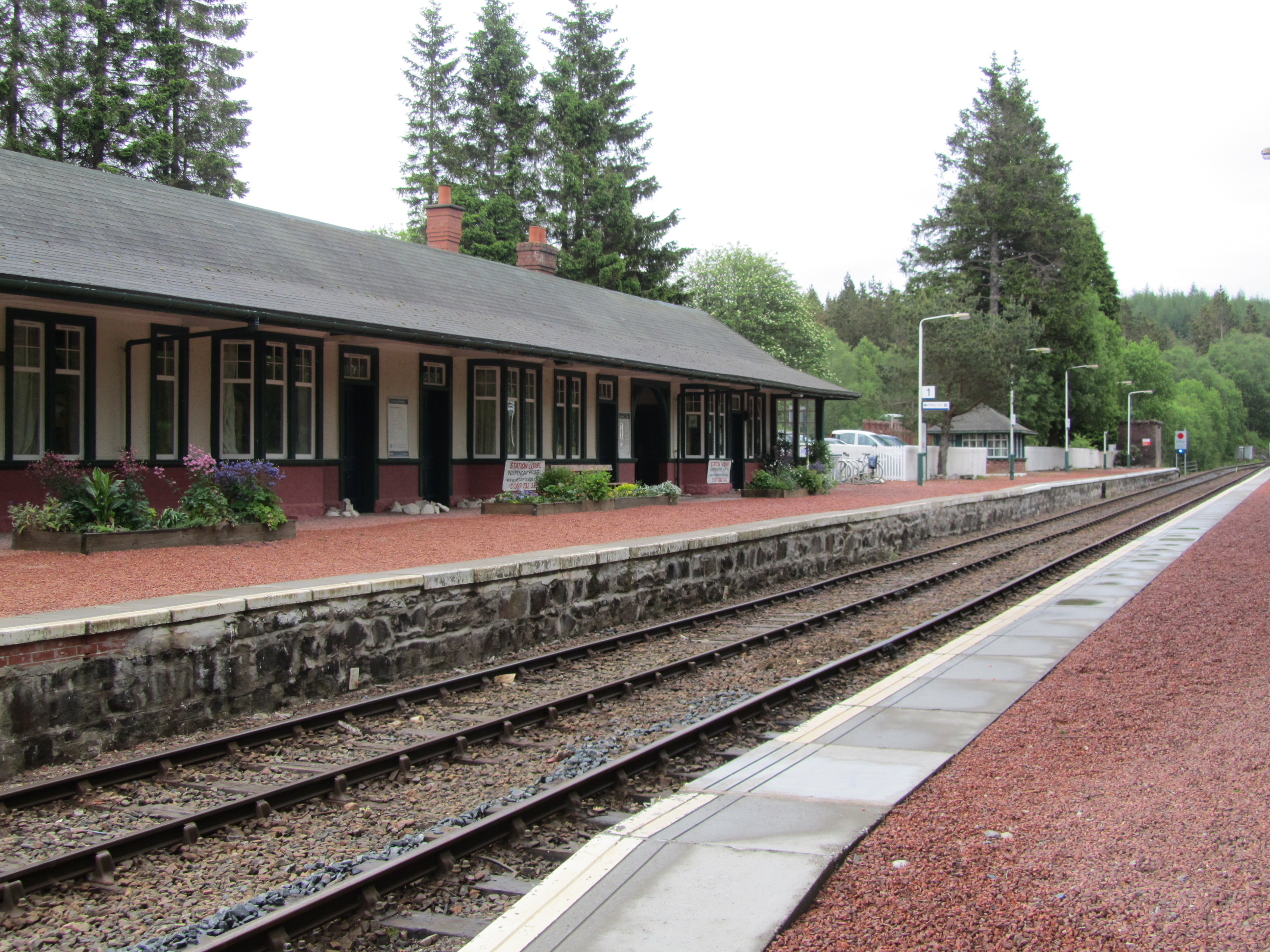
- Tulloch station, looking east (towards Glasgow)

General information
- Location: Tulloch, Lochaber, Highland; Scotland
- Coordinates: 56.8841°N 4.7012°W
- Grid reference: NN354802
- Manager: ScotRail
- Platforms: 2

Other information
- Station code: TUL

History
- Original company: West Highland Railway
- Pre-grouping: North British Railway
- Post-grouping: LNER

Key dates
- 7 August 1894: Opened as Inverlair
- 1 January 1895: Renamed as Tulloch

Passengers
- 2021/22: ▲1,500
- 2022/23: ▲1,544
- 2023/24: ▲2,106
- 2024/25: ▲2,252
- 2025/26: ▼2,128
Location
Notes
- Passenger statistics from the Office of Rail and Road

Tulloch railway station is a rural railway station in the remote Tulloch area of the Highland region of Scotland. This station is on the West Highland Line, between Corrour and Roy Bridge, sited 81 miles 59 chains (131.5 km) from Craigendoran Junction, near Helensburgh.

== History ==
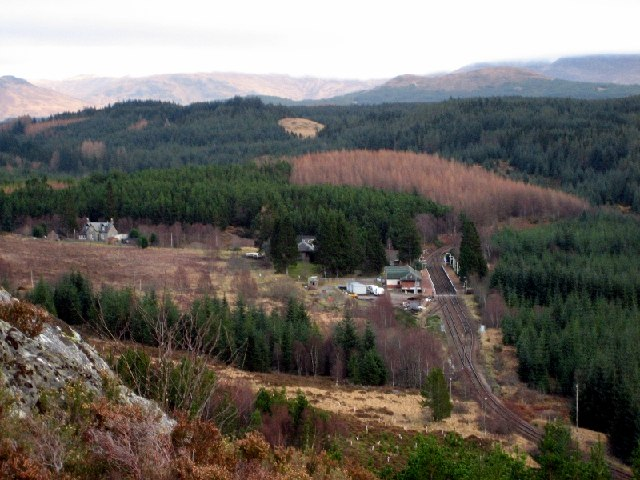
The station as seen from an elevated position

When the railway opened on 7 August 1894 the station was named Inverlair. It was renamed Tulloch on 1 January 1895.

The station was laid out with two platforms, one on either side of a crossing loop. There are sidings on the north side of the station.

The station buildings are now used as a hostel. The station was host to a LNER camping coach from 1935 to 1939.

=== Loch Treig derailment ===
On 28 June 2012, GB Railfreight-operated 66734 derailed at Loch Treig, approximately three miles from Tulloch, whilst working the a feight train from North Blyth to Fort William. The locomotive derailed approximately 25 metres above Loch Treig itself. As a result of the remote location, the driver of the train was rescued by a search & rescue helicopter, and the locomotive was cut up on site. The line reopened on Wednesday 11 July.

== Facilities ==
The facilities here are extremely basic, consisting of benches on both platforms, and a car park adjacent to platform 1. Both platforms have step-free access, but the only access to platform 2 is via a barrow crossing. As there are no facilities to purchase tickets, passengers must buy one in advance, or from the guard on the train.

== Passenger volume ==
With 266 entries and exits in the 2020/21 period, Tulloch is the least busy station in Scotland with direct London services, and the least busy station along the line from Glasgow Queen Street to Fort William.

Passenger Volume at Tulloch
	2004–05	2005–06	2006–07	2007–08	2008–09	2009–10	2010–11	2011–12	2012–13	2013–14	2014–15	2015–16	2016–17	2017–18	2018–19	2019–20	2020–21	2021–22	2022–23	2023–24	2024–25
Entries and exits	2,083	2,122	2,314	2,365	2,394	2,052	2,216	2,136	2,124	2,046	1,998	1,804	1,616	1,774	2,148	1,770	266	1,500	1,544	2,106	2,252

The statistics cover twelve month periods that start in April.

== Services ==
Monday to Saturday, Tulloch has three northbound services to Fort William and Mallaig and one service to Fort William only (the Highland Caledonian Sleeper). Southbound, there are three services to Glasgow Queen Street and one service to London Euston (except Saturday nights). On Sundays, there are two services northbound to Mallaig, two services southbound to Glasgow Queen Street, and the Caledonian Sleeper to London Euston. The sleeper also carries seated coaches and can thus be used by regular travellers to both Glasgow and Edinburgh Waverley.

Preceding station	National Rail	Following station
Corrour	ScotRail; West Highland Line	Roy Bridge
Corrour	Caledonian Sleeper; Highland Caledonian Sleeper	Roy Bridge
	Historical railways	
Fersit Halt; Line open; station closed	North British Railway; West Highland Railway	Roy Bridge; Line and station open

== Bibliography ==
- Brailsford, Martyn, ed. (December 2017) [1987]. Railway Track Diagrams 1: Scotland & Isle of Man (6th ed.). Frome: Trackmaps. ISBN 978-0-9549866-9-8.
- Butt, R. V. J. (October 1995). The Directory of Railway Stations: details every public and private passenger station, halt, platform and stopping place, past and present (1st ed.). Sparkford: Patrick Stephens Ltd. ISBN 978-1-85260-508-7. OCLC 60251199. OL 11956311M.
- Caton, Peter (2018). Remote Stations. Leicestershire: Matador. ISBN 978-1-78901-408-2.
- Jowett, Alan (March 1989). Jowett's Railway Atlas of Great Britain and Ireland: From Pre-Grouping to the Present Day (1st ed.). Sparkford: Patrick Stephens Ltd. ISBN 978-1-85260-086-0. OCLC 22311137.
- McRae, Andrew (1997). British Railway Camping Coach Holidays: The 1930s & British Railways (London Midland Region). Vol. Scenes from the Past: 30 (Part One). Foxline. ISBN 1-870119-48-7.
- Quick, Michael (2022) [2001]. Railway passenger stations in Great Britain: a chronology (PDF). version 5.04. Railway & Canal Historical Society. Archived from the original (PDF) on 25 November 2022.
- "Tulloch station restored as a quality bunkhouse". RAIL. No. 333. EMAP Apex Publications. 17–30 June 1998. p. 16. ISSN 0953-4563. OCLC 49953699.
