= Roy Bridge railway station =

Railway station in the Scottish Highlands

Roy Bridge Scottish Gaelic: Drochaid Ruaidh
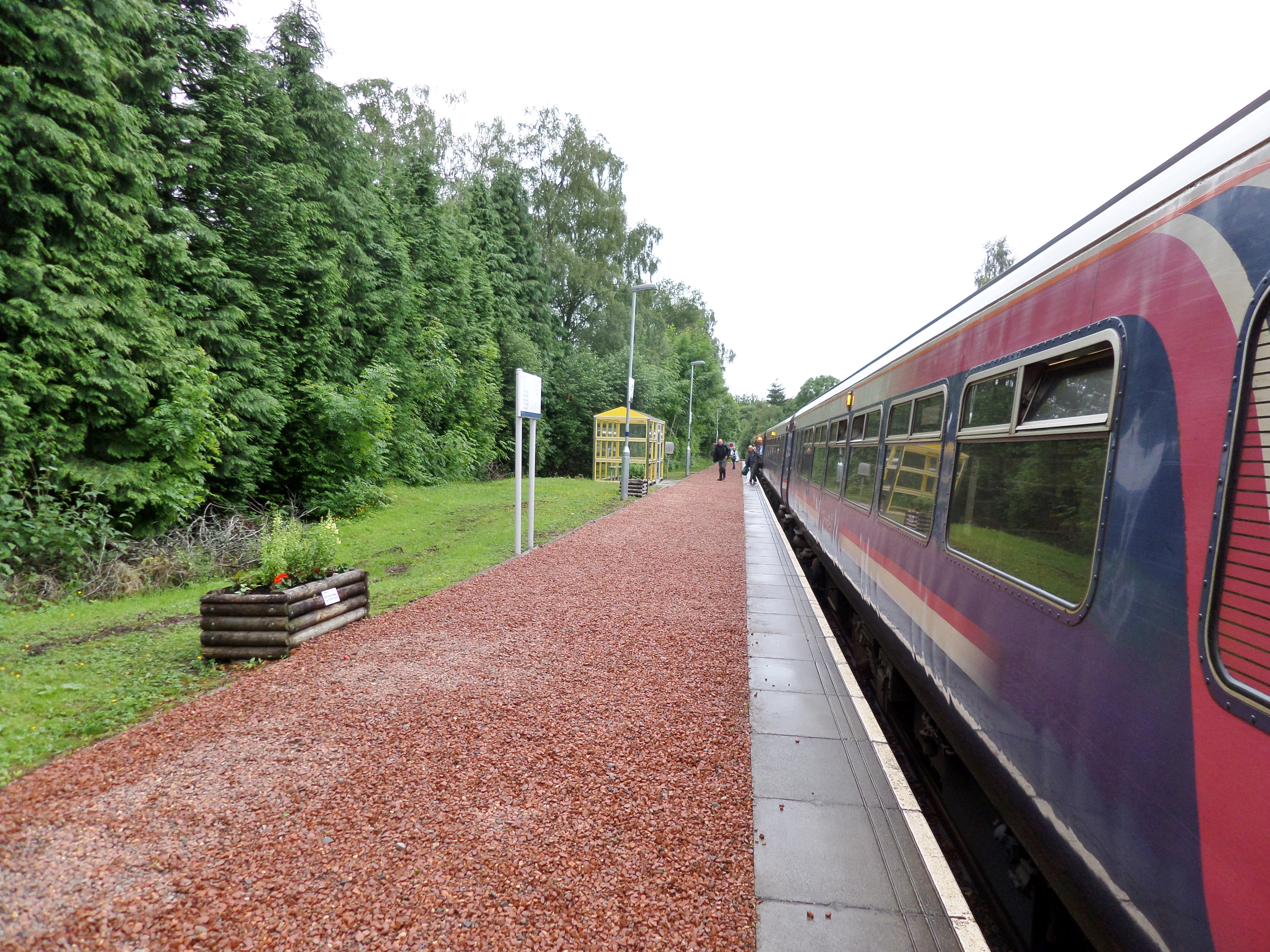

General information
- Location: Roybridge, Highland; Scotland
- Coordinates: 56.8884°N 4.8376°W
- Grid reference: NN272810
- Manager: ScotRail
- Platforms: 1

Other information
- Station code: RYB

Key dates
- 7 August 1894: Opened

Passengers
- 2021/22: ▲2,696
- 2022/23: ▼2,520
- 2023/24: ▲3,408
- 2024/25: ▼3,332
- 2025/26: ▲3,502
Location
Notes
- Passenger statistics from the Office of Rail and Road

Roy Bridge railway station is a railway station serving the village of Roybridge in the Highland region of Scotland. This station is on the West Highland Line, between Tulloch and Spean Bridge, sited 87 miles 35 chains (140.7 km) from Craigendoran Junction, near Helensburgh. ScotRail manage the station and operate most services, along with Caledonian Sleeper.

== History ==
This station opened by the West Highland Railway on 7 August 1894. The station was originally a two platform station, with sidings to the north. The station was host to a LNER camping coach from 1935 to 1939. A camping coach was also positioned here by the Scottish Region from 1952 to 1960.

== Facilities ==
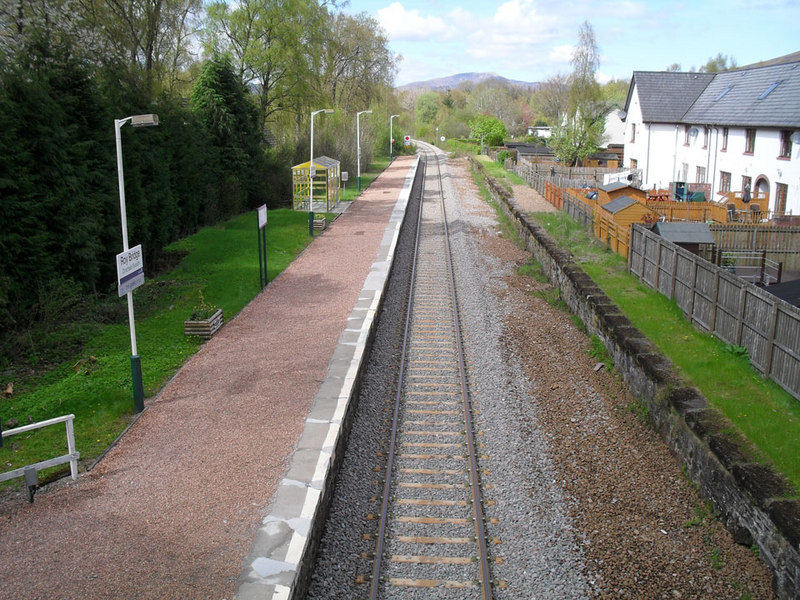
The station seen from the footbridge

The station is equipped with a waiting room, a bench, a help point and some bike racks. The station is only accessible from a stepped overbridge and thus has no step-free access. As there are no facilities to purchase tickets, passengers must buy one in advance, or from the guard on the train.

== Passenger volume ==
Passenger Volume at Roy Bridge
	2004–05	2005–06	2006–07	2007–08	2008–09	2009–10	2010–11	2011–12	2012–13	2013–14	2014–15	2015–16	2016–17	2017–18	2018–19	2019–20	2020–21	2021–22	2022–23	2023–24	2024–25
Entries and exits	3,344	3,370	3,812	4,301	3,936	4,112	3,878	4,084	4,270	3,856	4,520	4,172	3,556	3,712	3,742	3,268	560	2,696	2,520	3,408	3,332

The statistics cover twelve month periods that start in April.

== Services ==
Mondays to Saturdays, the station is served by three Scotrail trains per day in each direction, northbound to Mallaig and southbound to Glasgow Queen Street, along with the Highland Caledonian Sleeper between London Euston and Fort William via Edinburgh Waverley (the latter doesn't run southbound on Saturday nights or northbound on Sunday mornings, and only calls at the station on request). Sundays see just two trains per day call, as well as the southbound sleeper. The sleeper also carries seated coaches and can thus be used by regular passengers from/to Glasgow (Queen St Low Level) and Edinburgh.

Preceding station	National Rail	Following station
Spean Bridge	ScotRail; West Highland Line	Tulloch
Spean Bridge	Caledonian Sleeper; Highland Caledonian Sleeper	Tulloch
