= James Nicol (minister) =

Scottish poet and minister

James Nicol (28 September 1769 – 5 November 1819) was a minister of the Church of Scotland, known as a poet and writer.

== Life ==
The son of Michael Nicol, he was born on 28 September 1769 at Innerleithen, Peeblesshire, went to the parish school, and was originally destined to be a shoemaker. He qualified at the University of Edinburgh for the ministry, and after acting as tutor in private families was licensed to preach by the presbytery of Peebles (25 March 1801).

Nicol became assistant to John Walker, parish minister of Traquair, near Innerleithen (15 May 1802), and succeeded to the charge, on the death of the incumbent, on 4 November. A knowledge of medicine acquired at university enabled him to vaccinate parishioners. In 1808 he founded the first friendly society at Innerleithen.

After a change in his religious views Nicol contemplated resigning his charge. He died, after a short illness, on 5 November 1819.

== Works ==
Nicol published at Edinburgh in 1805, in two volumes, Poems, chiefly in the Scottish Dialect, and he is represented in Alexander Whitelaw's Book of Scottish Song, 1844. An Essay on the Nature and Design of Scripture Sacrifice appeared in London in 1823.

Besides contributing poems to the Edinburgh Magazine, Nicol, who studied ecclesiastical history and forms, wrote articles for the Edinburgh Encyclopædia.

== Family ==
In 1802 Nicol married Agnes Walker, sister of his predecessor, Rev John Walker, whose virtues he had celebrated in verse. She died on 19 March 1845. They had three daughters and three sons, including the geologist James Nicol.

== Notes ==
Attribution

This article incorporates text from a publication now in the public domain: Lee, Sidney, ed. (1895). "Nicol, James (1769-1819)". Dictionary of National Biography. Vol. 41. London: Smith, Elder & Co.
