= George Armstrong (physician) =

George Armstrong (c. 1720 – 1789) was a Scottish physician recognised as an important early paediatrician.

== Biography ==
Armstrong was born as the eighth child of the Minister of Castleton Church, in the Liddel Valley, Roxburgh. His brother was John Armstrong, the poet. After practising pharmacy at Hampstead, he qualified as a physician, moved to London, and established in 1769, the first dispensary, called the Dispensary for the Infant Poor, supported by contributions, for the relief of poor children. This institution existed for more than twelve years, and it was calculated that 35,000 children were relieved during that time. But it met with small financial support, and in December 1781 it was closed.

In 1767, Armstrong published an Essay on the Diseases most Fatal to Infants; a second edition appeared in 1771, and a third edition, dedicated to Queen Charlotte, in 1777. An enlarged edition appeared in 1808, edited by A. P. Buchan, M.D. To the third edition was appended A General Account of the Dispensary for the Infant Poor, which had been printed, in a shorter form, in 1772. Armstrong stated that children were received "without any letters of admission, provided the parents are really indigent, the case dangerous, and requiring speedy relief". Armstrong's reputation, however, had been damaged by a 1784 book of Michael Underwood, that both borrowed Armstrong's ideas and criticised them.

In Rees's Cyclopaedia Armstrong was said to have died "in obscurity". He left three daughters (to whom their uncle had bequeathed his property) and a widow.
