= Thomas Jamieson =

Scottish geologist

Thomas Francis Jamieson
- Born: 1829
- Died: 1913 (aged 83–84)
- Citizenship: United Kingdom
- Education: University of Aberdeen
- Awards: Murchison Medal (1898)
- Scientific career
- Fields: geologist
- Workplaces: University of Aberdeen

Thomas Francis Jamieson (1829-1913) was a Scottish scientist most associated with his studies of sea level and glacial isostasy during the Quaternary.

Born the son of a jeweller, Jamieson was raised in Aberdeen and educated at Aberdeen Grammar School and the University of Aberdeen, at which he was appointed Fordyce Lecturer in Agriculture in 1862, a post he held for 15 years. He was later employed as the factor managing the estate lands of Ellon Castle in Aberdeenshire.

Interested in geology from an early age, Jamieson corresponded widely with other scientists, including Charles Lyell and Charles Darwin. After early research on petrology, Jamieson studied the glaciated rocks of Scotland, providing evidence for the then-fledgling theory of ice ages. Later work on marine sediments found above sea level in the Forth Valley convinced Jamieson that the area had once been beneath sea level, and that this was caused by the weight of glaciers depressing the land.

While these views brought Jamieson into conflict with the prevailing orthodoxy of the Geological Survey of Scotland (now the British Geological Survey), he continued to elaborate them, identifying raised shorelines around Scotland at a series of elevations (7.6, 15.0 or 30.5 metres). Despite these efforts, and his election to the Geological Society of London in 1862, his views on the geological history of Scotland only gained full acceptance in the late 20th century.

== See also ==
- Post-glacial rebound
- Glen Roy
