= James Henderson Nicoll =

Scottish pediatric surgeon

- James Nicoll
- Born: 30 September 1863; Glasgow
- Died: 15 August 1921 (aged 57)
- Education: University of Glasgow
- Known for: "Father of day surgery"
- Awards: Legion of Honour
- Scientific career
- Fields: Surgery
- Workplaces: Western Infirmary, Anderson's University

James Henderson Nicoll FRCS(G), JP (30 September 1863 – 15 August 1921) was a Scottish paediatric surgeon and professor of surgery at Anderson's University. He was a pioneer of pediatrics, particularly regarding the care of children both in the hospital and after discharge. Nicoll was most notable for developing a surgical cure for pyloric stenosis and outpatient care of children with spina bifida, and was known as the "father of day surgery".

== Life ==
Nicoll was the son of Reverend James Nicoll, who was a distinguished minister in Glasgow. Nicoll undertook his early education at Glasgow Academy before attending to study medicine at the University of Glasgow at age 16, and graduating at the age of 23 with a Bachelor of Medicine, Bachelor of Surgery (MB CM Glasgow) in 1886. He decided to specialise in surgery, and after taking a junior house post at the Western Infirmary, under Sir Hector Clare Cameron, Professor of Clinical Surgery at the University of Glasgow and Western Infirmary and Sir Thomas McCall Anderson, he decided to travel to London, to undertake a four-year surgical apprenticeship with Sir Frederick Treves in London. After Nicoll finished his apprenticeship, he toured Europe extensively, visiting a number of hospitals that provided the best paediatric surgery services.

== Career ==
Upon returning to Glasgow in 1891, Nicholl was appointed as a dispensary surgeon at the Western Infirmary outpatient department, The Dispensary in West Graham Street, Glasgow, a position he held until 1895. In 1896 he was promoted to assistant surgeon which came with a chair at the board of management at the Infirmary. In 1903 he was promoted to professor of surgery at Anderson's University. He held this post until 1908, when he was again promoted to Visiting Surgeon at the Western Infirmary, a position he held until 1914, when he resigned with the start of World War I. Although he resigned in 1914, he continued to perform surgery until 1917, when he was dispatched to France. In 1900 he published the first successful operation for pyloric stenosis.

In 1903 Nicoll became a Fellow of the Royal Faculty of Physicians and Surgeons of Glasgow. In 1911, he became a justice of the peace for the County and the City of Glasgow. In 1915, the mathematician and former prime minister Raymond Poincaré, then Rector of the University of Glasgow, nominated Nicoll to the assessor on the University Court. He also served as secretary to the West of Scotland Board of the British Medical Association and as vice president for the paediatric surgery section of the BMA. On 22 December 1920, he became a director of the Royal Hospital for Sick Children, Glasgow.

Nicoll died seven months later, from a condition related to dysentery he received while in France in 1918.

== Contributions ==
Nicoll was an advocate for day surgery and published a paper in the British Medical Journal about his experiences of the approximately 9000 paediatric surgical patients, most of whom he operated on, alone at the Dispensary. Nichol believed inpatient treatment to be a waste of hospital resources, as the results obtained at the Dispensary were equally as good but at a fraction of the cost. He believed that carefully selected children recovered at home, in the care of their family, provided they were given the necessary education and information to care for their child. Nichol believed that by removing children from their inpatient beds, their treatment and recovery would be of a higher quality. In the paper, Nicoll stated:

for seven years I have had a small house, near the Glasgow Children's Hospital, for the accommodation of young infants and their mothers. The mothers are catered for, and themselves nurse their infants. My experience of the cases so treated has been such as to make me confident in the opinion that no children's hospital can be considered complete which has not, in the hospital or hard by, accommodation for a certain number of nursing mothers whose infants require operation.

Between 1899 and 1901 he undertook 406 cleft lip and cleft palate operations using chloroform as the anaesthetic in the majority of cases. He reported to the British Medical Journal that in a series of 8988 operations performed in the Dispensary, he performed 7392 by himself. Around half of these patients were aged 3 years or younger, with many under 1 year old.

As an educationalist Nicolls was ahead of his time, by illustrating his lectures which were greatly admired and attended by students, nurses and doctors alike. He spared no expense in using the latest technology often bought with his own money. Nicolls was considered a medical politician, clashing with authorities on a number of cases in his zeal to develop and help the nursing professions and develop his ideas of day surgery, which were contrary to established practice at the time.

== Bibliography ==
- "THE SURGERY OF INFANCY" (PDF). British Medical Journal: 753–754. 18 September 1909.

== Awards and honours ==
- Cross of the Legion of Honour 1920. Awarded by the French ambassador.
