= Georges Maurice Debove =

French internist and pathologist

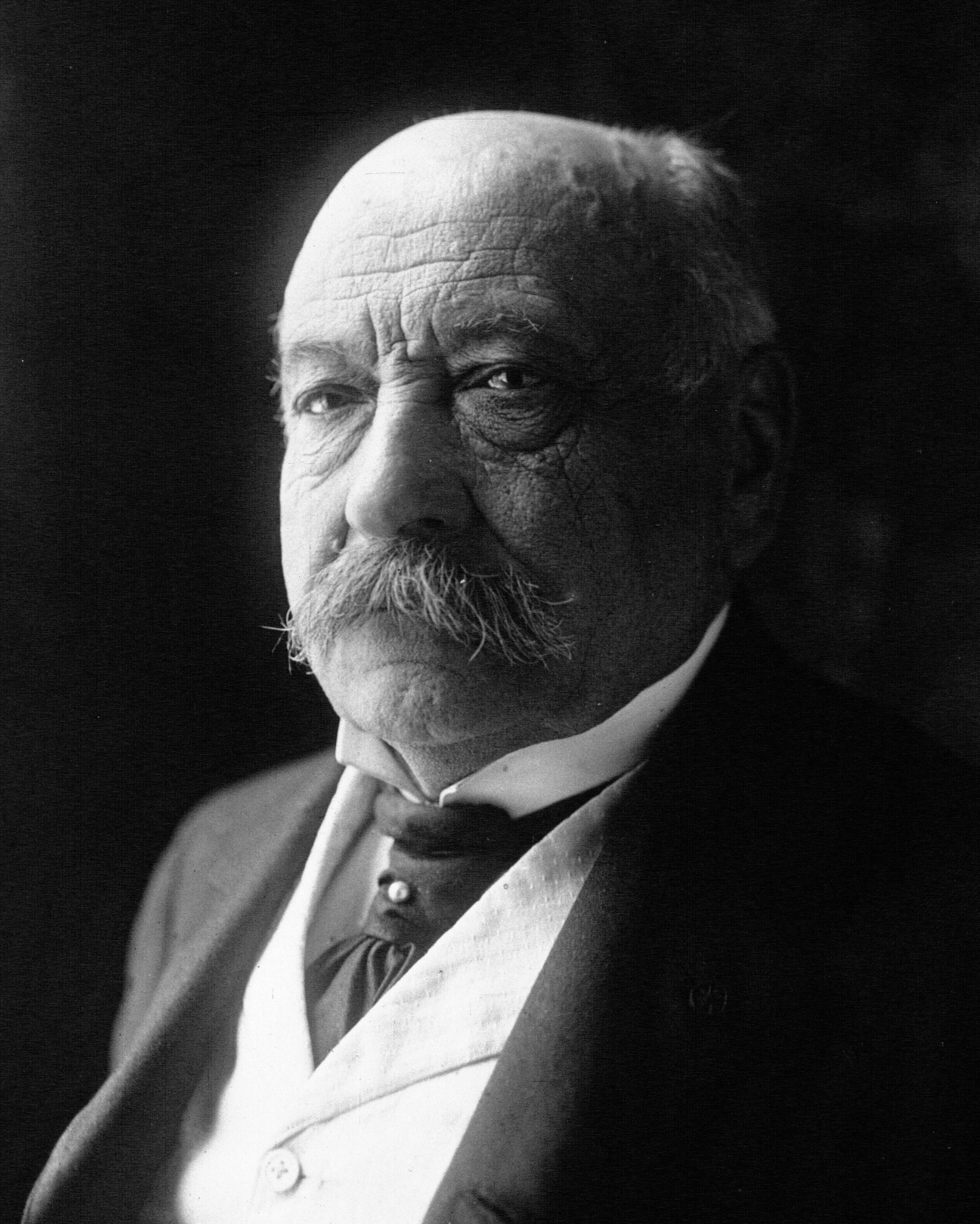
- Georges Maurice Debove (1913)
- Born: 11 March 1845; Clignancourt, France
- Died: 19 November 1920 (aged 75)
- Occupations: internist and pathologist
- Known for: early advocate of social hygiene
- Notable work: Written works
- Awards: member, Académie de Médecine

Georges Maurice Debove (French pronunciation: [ʒɔʁʒ mɔʁis dəbɔv]; 11 March 1845, Clignancourt – 19 November 1920) was a French internist and pathologist.

In 1869 he received his internship in Paris, followed by agrégation in 1878. From 1890 to 1900, he served as a professor to the Faculté de Médecine in Paris (second chair of medical pathology). In 1901 he was appointed second chair of clinical medicine at the Hôpital de la Charité.

In 1893 he became a member of the Académie de Médecine, serving as its secrétaire perpétuel from 1913 to 1920. Following the death of Paul Brouardel in 1906, he became dean of the Faculté de Médecine.

== Written works ==
Debove was the author of numerous articles on a wide array of subjects. He was an early advocate of social hygiene, and known for his work dealing with health issues that included alcoholism and tuberculosis. With internist Charles Achard, he published a nine volume medical manual, Manuel de médecine (1893-1897), and with Achard and Joseph Castaigne, he was co-author of works involving diseases of the internal organs:

- Manuel des maladies des reins et des capsules surrénale, 1906 - Manual on maladies of the kidneys and adrenal glands.
- Manuel des maladies du tube digestif, 1907/08 - Manual on maladies of the gastrointestinal tract.
- Manuel des maladies du foie et des voies biliaires, 1910 - Manual on maladies of the liver and bile duct.

With his friend Jean-Martin Charcot, the "Bibliotheque Charcot-Debove" was named, a literary collection in which dozens of authors participated — Jules Séglas (1859-1939), Ernest Mosny (1861-1918), Paul Sollier (1861-1933) and Victor Charles Hanot (1844-1896), to name a few.

== See also ==
- A Clinical Lesson at the Salpêtrière – 1887 group tableau portrait by André Brouillet
