= C. Mel Wilcox =

American gastroenterologist

Charles Melburn "Mel" Wilcox is a professor of medicine and director of the Division of Gastroenterology and Hepatology at the University of Alabama, Birmingham. Wilcox has authored over 200 peer-reviewed publications, book chapters, and miscellaneous articles such as Atlas of Clinical Gastrointestinal Endoscopy.

== Sources ==
- http://www.dom.uab.edu/gastro/
- Help Heartburn Faculty : C. Mel Wilcox, MD
- http://www.bukabuku.com/browse/bookdetail/50129/atlas-of-clinical-gastrointestinal-endoscopy.html
