= Emergency contraceptive availability by country =

This table includes a list of countries by emergency contraceptive availability.

(LNG refers to Levonorgestrel and UPA refers to Ulipristal acetate).

Emergency contraceptive availability by country Allows direct access to EC over the counter Allows access to EC from a pharmacist without requiring a prescription Requires a prescription to access EC EC not available

Country	Region	Availability	Over the counter	Non-prescription	Age restriction	Cost	Awareness	Notes
Afghanistan	Asia	Import only	✗	✗				
Albania	Europe	✓	✓	✓	None	€15,60 (UPA) €4,50 (LNG)	66-75%	"Currently, Postinor-2 (LNG) is the only EC brand available in Albania as there is a stock out of NorLevo in the country for unknown reasons."
Algeria	Africa	✓	✗	✓ (LNG only)				
Andorra	Europe	✓	✗	✓ (16 and over)	Under 16s require parental consent	€20 – €26 (UPA) €6,1 – €7,8 (LNG)		
Angola	Africa	✓ (34%)	✗	✗		580 - 2950 AKZ	23.5%	
Antigua and Barbuda	Caribbean	✓	✗	✓	Some restrictions			
Argentina	South America	✓	✓	✓	Over 14	Free at all public hospitals in Buenos Aires		
Armenia	Caucasus	✓	✗	✓				
Aruba	Caribbean	✓	✓	✓	None			
Australia	Oceania	✓	✗	✓ (LNG only)	None	$20–$30 (LNG)	97%	"Pharmacists can refuse supply on religious grounds, but must refer the woman to another supplier"
Austria	Europe	✓	✓	✓	None	€31,90 (UPA) €12,90–13,50 (LNG)	≥84%	Common claim that it acts like an abortifacient
Azerbaijan	Caucasus	✓	✗	✓				
Bahamas	Caribbean	✓	✗	✓ (LNG only)				Only available in family planning clinics
Bahrain	Asia	✗	✗	✗				
Bangladesh	Asia	✓	✓	✓	None	৳24,00 Free (government clinics)	"Relatively unknown", 2001	
Barbados	Caribbean	✓	✗	✓ (LNG only)				Access restricted due to misinformation
Belgium	Europe	✓	✓	✓	None	€24,99 (€15,99 if <21 years old) (UPA), €8,55–€9,85 (€0–€0,85 if <21 years old) (LNG)		Fully reimbursed under prescription if under 21
Belarus	Europe	✓	✗	✓ (LNG only)	None	€17 (UPA) €10 (LNG)		
Belize	Central America	✓	✗	✓ (LNG only)				
Benin	Africa	✓	✗	✓				
Bhutan	Asia	✓	✓	✓				Over the counter EC introduced in 2018
Bolivia	South America	✓	✗	✓	None	Bs55.50		
Bosnia and Herzegovina	Europe	✓	✗	✗		€25,30–30,00 (UPA) €14,50–22,50 (LNG)		Anecdotally available without prescription
Botswana	Africa	✓	✗	✓ (LNG only)				
Brazil	South America	✓	✗	✓	None	Free at most public hospitals, R$35 otherwise		
Brunei	Asia	✓	✗	✗			30BND (LNG)	Available with a Drs prescription from private clinics
Bulgaria	Europe	✓	✓	✓	None (UPA) Over 16 (LNG)	€22,00 (UPA) €15,00 (LNG)	≥84%	
Burkina Faso	Africa	✓	✗	✓				
Burundi	Africa	✓ (31%)	✗	✓			22.9%	Women can be refused service by providers, and it is disapproved of by church leaders. Many are secretive about contraceptive use.
Cameroon	Africa	✓	✗	✓				
Cambodia	Asia	✓	✗	✓				
Canada	North America	✓	✓ (except Saskatchewan)	✓ (LNG only)				
Canada (Quebec)	North America	✓	✗	✗				
Cape Verde	Africa	✗	✗	✗				Possibly due to small population
Central African Republic	Africa	✓	✗	✗				
Chad	Africa	✓	✗	✓				
Chile	South America	✓	✗	✓	None			
China	Asia	✓	✗	✓				
Colombia	South America	✓	✗	✗				
Comoros	Africa	Import only	✗	✗				
Congo, Democratic Republic of	Africa	✓ (LNG only)	✗	✗		XOF 1200	23% (2015, Kinshasa)	
Costa Rica	Central America	✗	✗	✗				Due to active opposition
Croatia	Europe	✓	✓	✓	LNG only available without prescription if over 16 years old	€25,60 (UPA) €21,40 (LNG)		
Cuba	Caribbean	✓	✗	✓				
Curaco	Caribbean	✓	✗	✓ (LNG only)	None			
Cyprus	Europe	✓	✓	✓	None	€29,42 (UPA)		Only UPA is available due to financial crisis
Czech Republic	Europe	✓	✓	✓ †	None (UPA) †Under 17s need a prescription (LNG)	€24,50 (UPA) €21,00 (LNG)	≥84%	
Denmark	Europe	✓	✓	✓	None	€23,36 (UPA) €12,45 (LNG)	45%	
Djibouti	Africa	✓	✗	✓				
Dominican Republic	Central America	✓	✗	✓				
East Timor	Oceania	✗	✗	✗				Due to conflict in the region
Ecuador	South America	✓	✗	✓ (only at public health clinics)	None	Free at public health premises		
Egypt	Africa	✓	✗	✗				
El Salvador	Central America	✓	✗	✓				
Equatorial Guinea	Africa	Import only						Pregnant girls are forced to leave school.
Eritrea	Africa	Import only						
Estonia	Europe	✓	✓	✓ (LNG only)		€18,73 (UPA) €15,79 (LNG)		
Ethiopia	Africa	✓	✗	✓				
Fiji	Oceania	Import only						
Finland	Europe	✓	✗	✓	None	€33,60 (UPA) €18,87 (LNG)	>90%	Sometimes provided free of charge in hospitals and family planning clinics
France	Europe	✓	✓	✓				LNG and UPA available for free without prescription to minors and adults alike in pharmacies, family-planning clinics, secondary school and university infirmaries
Gabon	Africa	✓	✗	✓			49%	
Gambia	Africa	Import Only	✗	✗				
Georgia	Caucasus	✓	✗	✓				
Germany	Europe	✓	✓	✓	Parental consent if under 14 years old	€30 (UPA) €18 (LNG)		If under 20 years old, free with prescription
Ghana	Africa	✓	✗	✓	None	4-19 Cedis	64%	
Greece	Europe	✓	✓	✓	None	€25.77 (UPA) €7 (LNG)		
Guatemala	Central America	✓	✗	✓ (LNG only)	None			
Guinea-Bissau	Africa	Import only						
Guinea-Conakry	Africa	✓	✗	✓				
Guyana	Caribbean	✓	✗	✓ (LNG only)		Guy $1000-$2500	30%	
Haiti	Caribbean	✓					19% / 58%	
Hungary	Europe	✓	✗	✗				Anecdotally easy to get without prescription along borders. Several doctors with a private practice offer online consultations and e-prescriptions for a fee.
Honduras	Central America	✓	✗	✓	N/A	N/A		After having been available one for cases of rape, it became legal for universal access in March 2023.
Hong Kong	Asia	✓	✗	✗				
Iceland	Europe	✓ (LNG only)	✓	✓				
India	Asia	✓	✓	✓			<33%	
Indonesia	Asia	✓	✗	✓				
Iran	Asia	✓	✗	✓				
Iraq	Asia	Import only						
Ireland	Europe	✓	✓	✓	No age restriction			
Israel	Middle East	✓	✗	✓	None	ILS 109.19-166 (UPA) ILS 55-100 (LNG)		
Italy	Europe	✓	✓	✓				
Ivory Coast	Africa	✓	✗	✓				
Jamaica	Central America	✓	✗	✓				
Japan	Asia	✓	✗	✓ (Since spring 2026)				
Jordan	Middle East	✗	✗	✗				
Kazakhstan	Asia	✓	✗	✗		€15,10 (UPA) €5,54 (LNG)		Easy to get without prescription along borders
Kenya	Africa	✓	✗	✓	None	Ksh200	59%	
Kiribati	Polynesia	Import only						
Kosovo	Europe	✓	✗	✓				
Kuwait	Asia	✓	✗	✗				
Kyrgyzstan	Asia	✓	✗	✗				
Laos	Asia	✓	✓	✓				
Latvia	Europe	✓	✗	✓				
Lebanon	Asia	✓	✗	✗				
Lesotho	Africa	✓	✗	✗			35%	
Libya	Africa	✗	✗	✗				Due to conflict in the region
Lithuania	Europe	✓	✗	✓ (LNG only)			≥84%	
Luxembourg	Europe	✓	✓	✓				Available for free without prescription at pharmacies
Madagascar	Africa	✓	✗	✓				
Malawi	Africa	✓	✓	✓			45%	
Malaysia	Asia	✓	✗	✓		$1.30-5.00 (LNG)		
Maldives	Asia	Import only	✗	✗				
Mali	Africa	✓	✗	✓				
Malta	Europe	✓	✗	✓		€37,94 (UPA) €19,90 (LNG)		Available since 2016 after a judicial protest from the Women's Rights Foundation There remains a common misconception that it is an abortifacient
Mauritania	Africa	✓	✗	✓				
Mauritius	Indian Ocean	✓	✗	✓				
Mexico	North America	✓	✓ (LNG only)	✓	None	Free in family planning centres	75%	
Micronesia	Oceania	✗	✗	✗				Possibly due to small population
Moldova	Europe	✓	✗	✓		€17,03 (UPA) €8,04 (LNG) † €4,21 – €4,73 (Mifepristone)	62% (2012)	† Free for women under 21 and in cases of rape at Youth Friendly Health Centres
Montenegro	Europe	✗						Possibly due to small population
Morocco	Africa	✓	✓	✓				
Mozambique	Africa	✓	✗	✓				
Myanmar	Asia	✓	✓	✓	None	Under Ks1,000		Sale was stopped by authorities during holidays
Nepal	Asia	✓ (LNG only)	✓	✓		Rs. 100-150	28% (2011)	Sales increased rapidly from 2015, so awareness data is possibly out of date
Netherlands	Europe	✓	✓	✓	None	€35 (UPA) €15 (LNG)		Reimbursed under prescription
New Zealand	Oceania	✓ (LNG only)	✗	✓	None	$35–$50		
Niger	Africa	✓	✓	✓			4% (2012)	
Nigeria	Africa	✓ (LNG only)	✓	✓	None	~$1.00	30% (2013)	
North Korea	Asia	✗						Due to conflict in the region
Norway	Europe	✓	✓	✓	None	€32,80 (UPA) €24,60 (LNG)		Often free of charge of needy patients
Oman	Middle East	✗	✗	✗				
Pakistan	Asia	✓	✗	✓				
Papua New Guinea	Oceania	Import only						
Paraguay	South America	✓	✗	✓		Free at some public hospitals, Gs. 35.000 otherwise		
Peru	South America	✓	✗	✗	None	Free		Many found to be counterfeit
Philippines	Asia	✗						Due to active opposition
Poland	Europe	✓	✗	✗			≥84%	Common misconception that it acts like an abortifacient
Portugal	Europe	✓	✓	✓		Free from family planning centres, €12 otherwise		
Qatar	Middle East	✗	✗	✗				
Romania	Europe	✓	✓	✓	None	€20 (UPA) €13 (LNG)	≥84%	
Russia	Asia	✓	✗	✗		€7,55 (LNG)	≥84%	De facto sold over counter, only LNG available
Rwanda	Africa	Import only	✗	✗				
Saint Kitts & Nevis	West Indies	✗						Possibly due to small population
Saint Vincent & Grenadines	Caribbean	Import only						
Samoa	Oceania	✓ †	✗	✗			4.7%	†Available only at the TTM National Referral Hospital in Apia, reportedly to discourage 'abuse' by either nurses or client.
São Tomé and Príncipe	Africa	Import only	✗	✗				
Saudi Arabia	Middle East	✗	✗	✗			6.2%	Prescription may have been available in the past, but it appears to be banned.
Senegal	Africa	✓	✗	✗	None	$10.36 (UPA) $7.50 (LNG)	13%	
Serbia	Europe	✓	✗	✓				
Seychelles	Africa	Import only						
Sierra Leone	Africa	✓ (LNG only)	✗	✗			6.2%	30% of girls have their first child before turning 18. Pregnant girls are forced to leave school.
Singapore	Asia	✓	✗	✗				
Slovakia	Europe	✓	✓	✓	None	€27 (UPA) €22 (LNG)		
Slovenia	Europe	✓	✓	✓				
Solomon Islands	Oceania	Import only						
Somalia	Africa	✗						Due to conflict in the region
South Africa	Africa	✓	✓	✓		R86,68–100,75 (LNG)	23%	
South Korea	Asia	✓	✗	✗				
South Sudan	Africa	Import only						
Spain	Europe	✓	✓	✓	None		≥84%	
Sri Lanka	Asia	✓ (LNG only)	✗	✓		Rs.90-150		
Sudan	Africa	✗						Due to conflict in the region
Suriname	South America	✓	✗	✓				
Sweden	Europe	✓	✓	✓	None	€25 (UPA) €17 (LNG) Free from youth centres		
Switzerland	Europe	✓	✗	✓		€32,85 (UPA) €17,50 (LNG)		
Syria	Asia	Import only						
Taiwan	Asia	✓	✗	✗				
Tajikistan	Asia	✓	✗	✓				
Tanzania	Africa	✓ (LNG only)	✗	✗		$5.00	11.8%	Twenty percent of 15-19-year-old girls become pregnant, and are forced to leave school.
Thailand	Asia	✓	✗	✓				
Tonga	Polynesia	Import only						
Tunisia	Africa	✓	✗	✓				
Turkey	Europe	✓	✗	✓		€12		
Tuvalu	Polynesia	✗						Possibly due to small population
UAE	Middle East	✗	✗	✗	N/A	N/A		Banned because of the claim that it is an abortifacient.
United Kingdom	Europe	✓	✓	✓	Over 16 without prescription	Free from health care professionals	≥84%	
United States of America	North America	✓ (80%)	✓ (LNG only)	✓ (LNG only)	None	$40–50 USD (LNG)	45%	"roughly 1 in ten teens were incorrectly told they were too young to get [emergency contraception] without a prescription."
Uruguay	South America	✓	✓	✓	Adult only			
Uzbekistan	Asia	✓	✓	✓				
Vanuatu	Oceania	✓	✓	✓		1000 Vatu		Personal experience in Port Vila, Efate 2018
Venezuela	South America	✗ †	✗	✓				†Technically available, but rare and prohibitively expensive due to economic collapse
Vietnam	Asia	✓	✗	✓ (LNG only)				
West Bank and Gaza	Middle East	Import only						
Western Sahara	Africa	✗						Due to conflict in the region and a small population
Zambia	Africa	✓	✓	✓		Free of charge at public health institutions	7.5%	
