= Genes & Diseases =

- Discipline: Medical genetics
- Language: English
- Edited by: Tong-Chuan He, Ailong Huang

Publication details
- History: 2014-present
- Publisher: Elsevier on behalf of Chongqing Medical University
- Frequency: Bimonthly
- Open access: Yes
- License: CC BY-NC-ND
- Impact factor: 7.103 (2020)

Standard abbreviations
- ISO 4: Genes Dis.

Indexing
- CODEN: GDEIAV
- ISSN: 2352-3042
- OCLC no.: 941178198

Links
- Journal homepage; Online archive

Genes & Diseases is a bimonthly peer-reviewed open access medical journal covering medical genetics. It is published by Elsevier on behalf of Chongqing Medical University in alliance with the Association of Chinese Americans in Cancer Research. It was established in 2014 and the editors-in-chief are Tong-Chuan He (University of Chicago Medical Center) and Ailong Huang (Chongqing Medical University).

== Abstracting and indexing ==
The journal is abstracted and indexed in:

- Biological Abstracts
- BIOSIS Previews
- Current Contents/Life Sciences
- Embase
- Science Citation Index Expanded
- Scopus

According to the Journal Citation Reports, the journal has a 2020 impact factor of 7.103.
