= Journal of Clinical and Translational Hepatology =

Medical Journal

- Discipline: Hepatology
- Language: English
- Edited by: Hong Ren, George Y. Wu, Harry Hua-Xiang Xia

Publication details
- History: 2013–present
- Publisher: Xia & He Publishing on behalf of The Second Affiliated Hospital of Chongqing Medical University (China)
- Frequency: Monthly
- Open access: Yes
- License: CC BY-NC 4.0
- Impact factor: 3.6 (2022)

Standard abbreviations
- ISO 4: J. Clin. Transl. Hepatol.

Indexing
- ISSN: 2225-0719 (print); 2310-8819 (web)
- OCLC no.: 90479736

Links
- Journal homepage; Online access; Online archive

The Journal of Clinical and Translational Hepatology is a monthly peer-reviewed medical journal covering hepatology established in 2013. It is owned by the Second Affiliated Hospital of Chongqing Medical University and published on their behalf by Xia & He Publishing. The editors-in-chief are Hong Ren (The Second Affiliated Hospital of Chongqing Medical University), George Y. Wu (University of Connecticut Health Center), and Harry Hua-Xiang Xia (The First Affiliated Hospital of Guangdong Pharmaceutical University).

== Abstract and indexing ==
- Current Contents/Clinical Medicine
- Science Citation Index Expanded
- Scopus (since 2013)

According to the Journal Citation Reports, the journal has a 2022 impact factor of 3.6.
