= Lei Han =

Chinese professor of cardiovascular medicine and doctoral supervisor

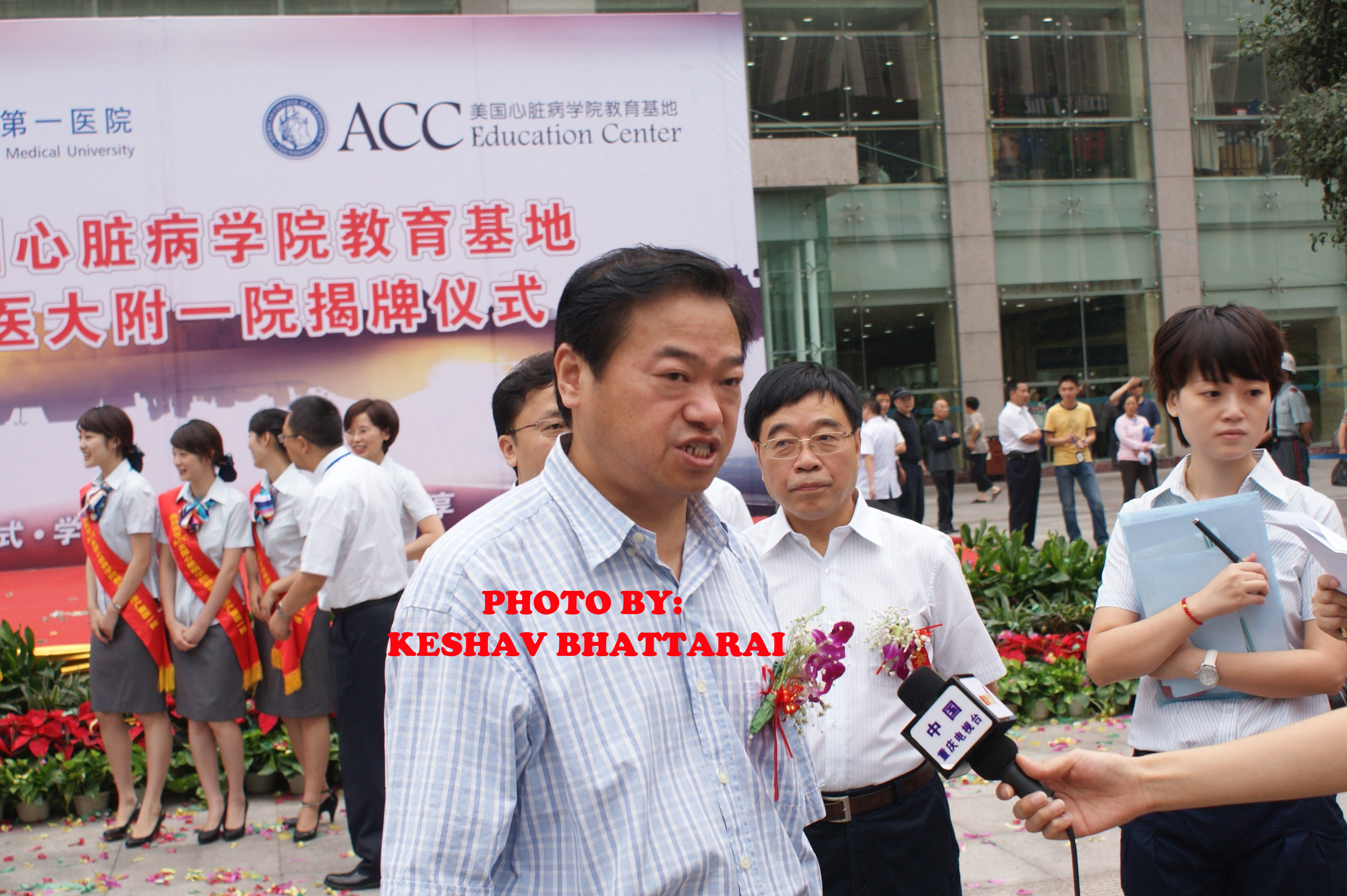
- Born: July 1957 (age 69); Chongqing, China
- Education: Chongqing Medical University, Harvard University
- Occupation: the President of Chongqing Medical University
- Website: www.cqmu.edu.cn

Lei Han (Chinese: 雷寒; pinyin: Léi Hán; born July 1957) is a professor of cardiovascular medicine, doctoral supervisor (tutor of Ph.D. or Doctorate student) and the President of Chongqing Medical University.

== Early life and education ==
Lei Han was born in July 1957 in Beibei, Chongqing. Lei Han received a bachelor's degree (MBBS) in clinical medicine from Chongqing Medical University in 1982, and a master's degree (MD) in cardiovascular medicine in 1987. From 1992 to 1993, he studied at Sloan-Kettering Cancer Center in New York City and from 1993 to 1995 Massachusetts General Hospital in Boston, Massachusetts.

== Career ==
From 1996 to 2004, Lei Han served as the Vice-president, then the Dean, of the First Affiliated Hospital of Chongqing Medical University.

In 2004, Lei Han was appointed as the president of Chongqing Medical University and Deputy Secretary of the party committee. He ran clinical practice, teaching, and scientific research work in the cardiovascular medicine department for over 20 years.

Lei Han is an expert in the general treatment and interventional therapy of cardiovascular diseases. His scientific research projects include the, National Ministry of Education “Higher School Teachers Aid Program” Project, National Natural Science Foundation of China the Doctoral Education Fund of the Ministry of Education of the People's Republic of China, Natural Science Foundation of Chongqing Municipal Science & Technology Commission, Chongqing Municipal Science and Technology Commission Project, the Chongqing Municipal Public Health Bureau Multi-level Research Project.

Lei Han has published 60 papers and six monographs in Chinese and international medical journals.

From 1996 to 2006, Lei Han trained 23 graduates, including 11 doctoral students and 12 Master's Degree (MD) students (two foreign students). He was honored with "Outstanding Young Expert" award by the National Ministry of Health and was the "Special Government Allowances" winner by the State Council.

Lei Han is the Chairman of the Committee of Cardiovascular Experts and the Chongqing Branch of the National Committee of China Society of Biomedical Engineering Cardiac Pacing and Electrophysiology, Vice-President of the Chongqing Medical Association and Chongqing College of Biomedical Engineering, Chairman of Cardiac Pacing and Cardiac Arrhythmia Professionals Committee, Judge of the National Natural Science Foundation Committee, Editorial Member of the Chinese Journal “The Cardiac Arrhythmia” and over 40 other posts.

The Cardiology department of the First Affiliated Hospital was founded in 1958. Later the cardiovascular expert Lin Qi, Chen Yunzhen, led by Professor Lei Han, established the academic and professional reputation and status of cardiology department of the First Affiliated Hospital to National level.

== Recent work ==
Due to Lei Han's work in clinical practice, teaching, and scientific research, the First Affiliated Hospital was selected by the American College of Cardiology (ACC) as one of the 65 ACC Education Centers in China and the only one in Chongqing.

On August 25, 2010, the opening ceremony of the Chongqing (ACC) Education Center took place. During the ceremony, Lei Han stated that the relationship between the First Affiliated Hospital and the ACC would:

- Promote a high level of academic exchanges and training activities with world's top international academic exchange platform.
- Develop social responsibility, academic thinking and clinical practices.
- Improve the level of public education, and improve the prevention and treatment of cardiovascular diseases.
