= Chauffard =

Chauffard is a French surname. Notable people with the surname include:

- Anatole Chauffard (1855–1932), French physician
- René-Jean Chauffard (1920–1972), French actor
