= Émile Achard =

French internist

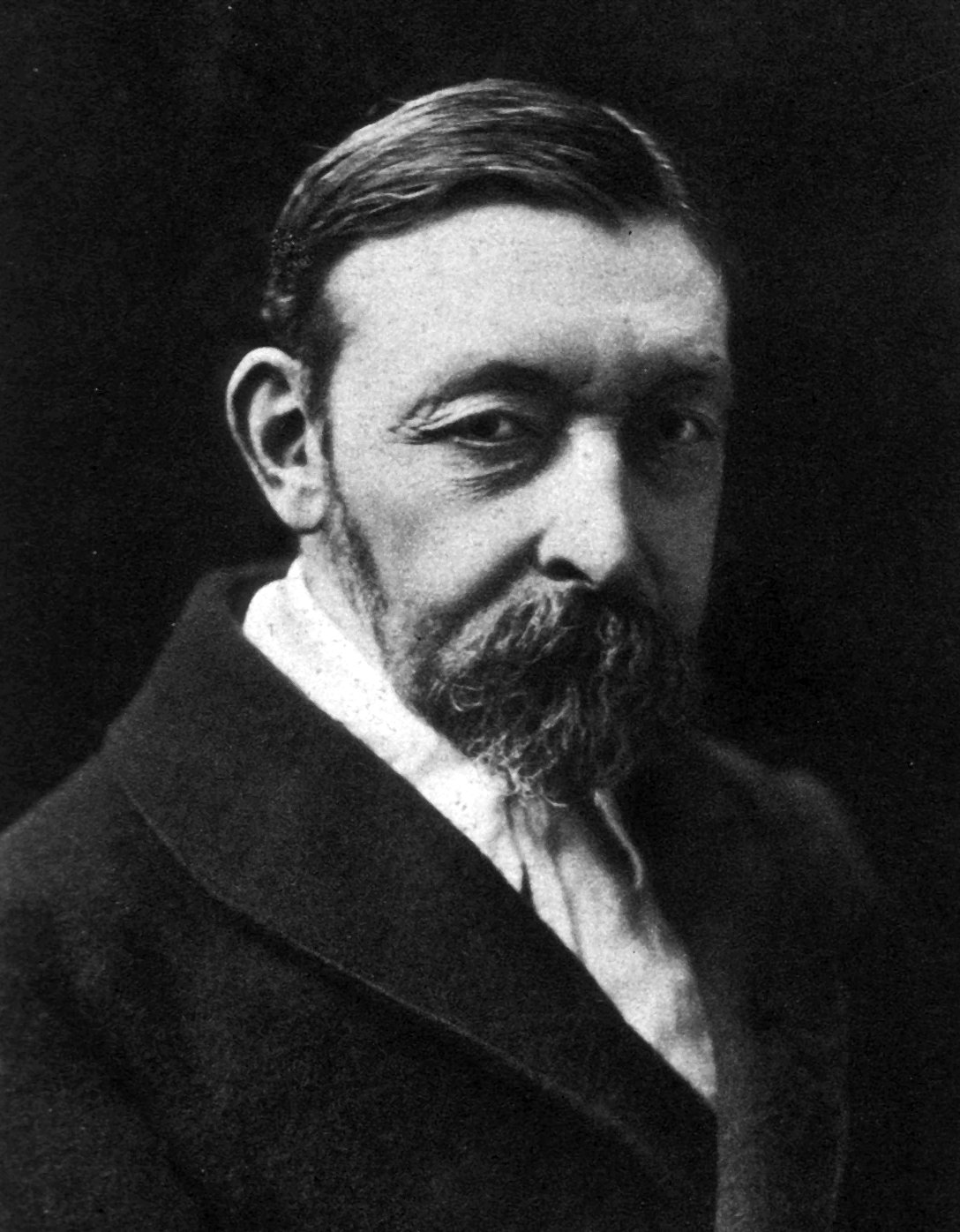
- Émile Charles Achard
- Born: 24 July 1860
- Died: 7 August 1944 (aged 84)

Émile Charles Achard (24 July 1860 – 7 August 1944) was a French internist born in Paris.

In Paris, he served as médecin des hôpitaux (from 1893), later becoming a professor of general pathology and therapeutics. In 1910, he was appointed professor of internal medicine at the University of Paris (Hôpital Beaujon). During his career, he also served as a physician at Hôpital Cochin.

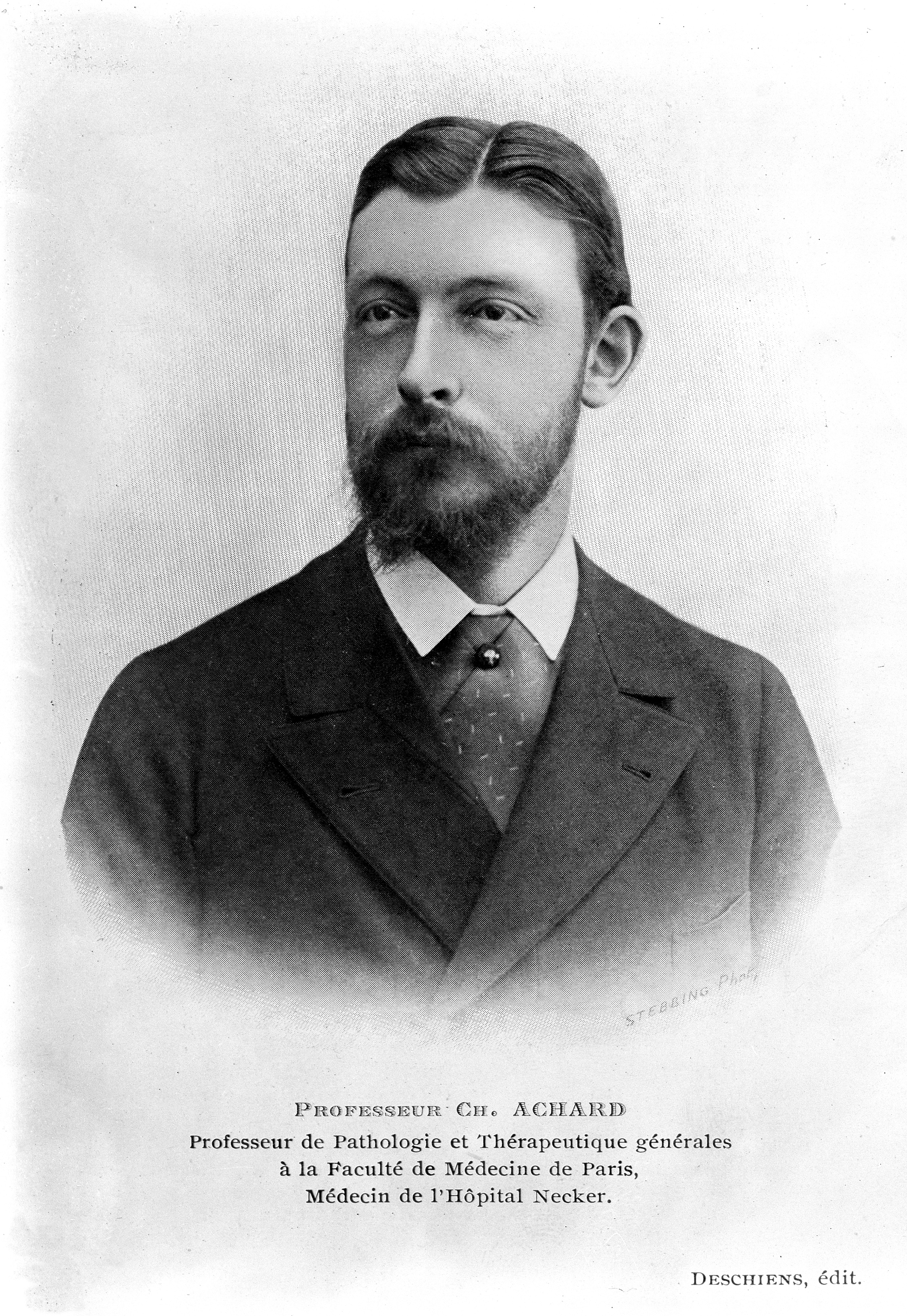
Achard in his youth

In 1895, he along with E. Phulpin wrote one of the earliest studies on post-mortem microbial analysis based on forensic biology. In 1896, along with Raoul Bensaude (1866–1938), he identified a disease he called paratyphoid fever. They were able to isolate the cause of illness to a microbe now classified as salmonella paratyphi B.

A postmenopausal condition known as "diabetic-bearded woman syndrome" is sometimes referred to as "Achard-Thiers syndrome", and the eponymous "Achard syndrome" is a disorder characterized by arachnodactyly, brachycephaly, a receding lower jaw and joint laxity in the extremities.

In 1897, along with internist Joseph Castaigne (1871–1951), he developed a urinary test using methylene blue dye for examining the excretory function of the kidneys. The procedure was to become known as the "Achard-Castaigne test". With Castaigne and Georges Maurice Debove (1845–1920), he published Manuel des maladies du tube digestif.
