= Emergency contraception in Spain =

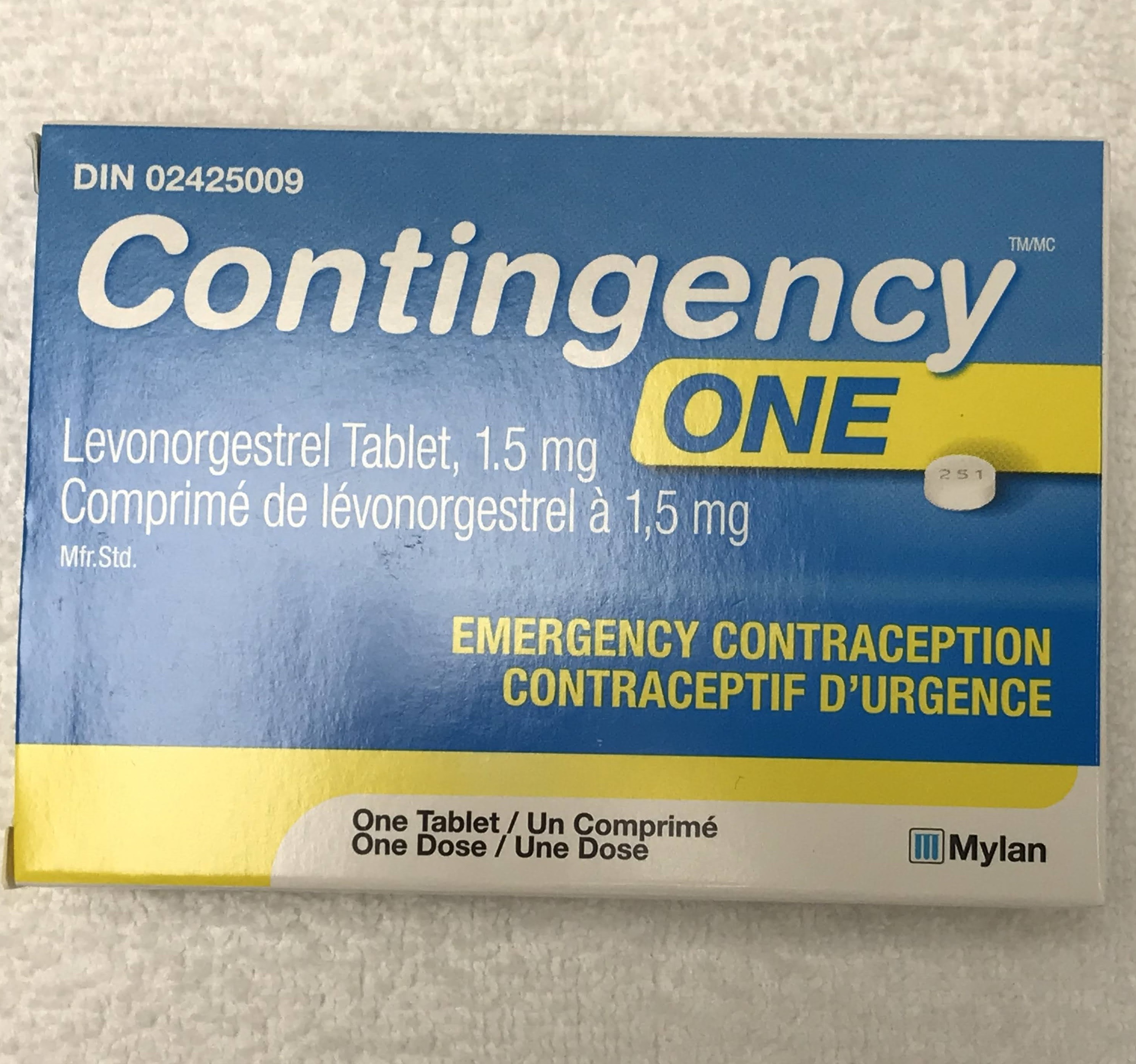
Levonorgestrel is used as an emergency contraceptive pill.

Emergency contraception in Spain refers to the contraceptive methods used in Spain that prevent a fertilized egg from implanting in the uterus. These include the morning-after pill and levonorgestrel. The situation in Spain is unique due to its history of access to contraception in general, the legislative timeline that legalized emergency contraception and under what conditions it could be dispensed, the impact of conscientious objection by doctors and pharmacists, cases in the Spanish judiciary related to conscientious objection, the relatively high cost compared to other countries in Europe and North America, the linkage of emergency contraception with efforts to reduce abortions by both left-wing and right-wing political parties, the impact of the COVID-19 pandemic on the distribution of emergency contraceptives, and usage statistics.

Article 149.1.16 of the Spanish Constitution grants the national government the exclusive right to regulate pharmaceutical products in Spain. Law 29/2006 grants the Spanish Agency of Medicines and Medical Devices (AEMPS) the right to modify conditions relating to prescription and dispensing for reasons related to public health or the defense of health. The distribution of the Emergency Contraceptive Pill (PAU) was authorized by the government led by José María Aznar's Popular Party on 23 March 2001 and its distribution began in May 2001. Policies regarding the use of emergency contraception in public healthcare were left to regional governments, resulting in different policies and levels of access across the country. These differences were clear in 2008. For this reason, in May 2009 the Spanish Government authorized the over-the-counter distribution of ECP-LNG to facilitate women's access to the drug and guarantee its effectiveness regardless of their place of residence, initiating its distribution in pharmacies without a prescription from September of that year. Spain's 2022 reproductive health law, Organic Law 4/2022, also changed how women could access emergency contraception in an effort to decrease abortions and create equitable access across the country. For the first time, national legislation ruled that the pill would be funded by the Ministry of Health, and would be provided free of charge in health centers throughout the country, requiring pharmacies to have emergency contraceptives in their inventories.

Chemical structural formula of the Ulipristal Acetate (EllaOne)

Norlevo and Postinor, the emergency contraceptive drugs with levonorgestrel as the active ingredient, were the brands authorized to sell the morning-after pill in Spain from May 2001. EllaOne, with the active ingredient ulipristal acetate (UPA), was approved for use in Spain in December 2009 and was sold as a 30 mg tablet at a cost of €32.78. Between 2001 and 2011, Spain recorded thirty-five adverse reactions and twenty serious adverse reactions in women using emergency contraception. The AEMPS reported in 2012 that the most common side effects of taking levonorgestrel were nausea, headache, dizziness, fatigue, gastrointestinal pain, bleeding, delayed menstruation, heavy menstruation, and increased breast tenderness. There are a number of laws governing the rights of minors related to access to emergency contraception. There are also national laws regarding what medications pharmacies must have in their inventory.

Women throughout Spain have sometimes had problems accessing emergency contraception. Sometimes hospitals had internal policies that denied women access to prescriptions for the morning-after pill. Some hospital doctors were conscientious objectors. Some pharmacies refused to sell it and some pharmacists were conscientious objectors. There were doctors who were reluctant to prescribe it to minors, despite the fact that they could legally do so without a guardian's permission. Many health centers in rural areas were closed on weekends or were not open 24 hours a day. There were women who also faced problems because their doctors required them to have a pregnancy test before administering emergency contraception. The requirement for a medical prescription made access difficult for many women. When it became available over the counter in pharmacies, the cost was often an issue.

== Context ==
At the national level, reversible contraceptive methods were decriminalized in Spain on 11 October 1978. In 1983, irreversible contraceptive methods such as vasectomies and tubal ligation were also legalized. Internationally, efforts to create a form of emergency contraception date back to the 1920s, when experiments were first conducted on monkeys. Emergency contraception was created in the 1960s at Yale University to prevent pregnancy after rape. Initially, emergency contraception relied on high doses of estrogen to prevent implantation of an egg. This had too many side effects, so new methods to prevent implantation were sought; in 1984 it was discovered that levonorgestrel (LNG) was the best active ingredient to achieve this and had a higher efficacy rate than ethinylestradiol. The World Health Organization (WHO) declared levonorgestrel an "essential medicine" in 1998.

Chemical structural formula of the Levonorgestrel

In September 2009 the drug was available in forty countries worldwide, fifteen of them located in Europe. In 2009, eight countries distributed emergency contraception free of charge and over the counter in pharmacies. They were the United Kingdom, France, Belgium, Denmark, Luxembourg and the United States. Albania, Belgium, Denmark, Slovenia, Finland, France, Great Britain, Greece, the Netherlands, Iceland, Luxembourg, Norway, Portugal, Sweden and Switzerland supplied it without a prescription, and some of them charged for it. Internationally, it was also available without a prescription in pharmacies in 2009 in Aruba, Australia, Benin, Burkina Faso, Cameroon, Canada, China, Congo, French Polynesia, Gabon, Ghana, Guinea-Conakry, India, Israel, Jamaica, Libya, Mali, Mauritania, Mauritius, New Zealand, Niger, Senegal, South Africa, Sri Lanka, Togo, Tunisia and Uganda.

== Definition and terms ==
According to the Ministry of Health, emergency contraceptives are medication that prevent a fertilized egg from implanting in the uterus. It acts before implantation to prevent a pregnancy from occurring, so it is not a medication that causes an abortion. The WHO, the Spanish Agency of Medicines and Medical Devices (AEMPS), and the European Medicines Agency all note that it is not abortifacient, nor does it cause abortions. The WHO also considers emergency contraception an "essential medicine" for women's health, and has explained: "Emergency contraception is only effective in the first few days after intercourse, before the egg leaves the ovary and before fertilization by a sperm occurs." However, according to some studies, an abortifacient effect cannot be ruled out.

There are a number of words used to describe emergency contraception in Spain. They include píldora postcoital (after-sex pill), píldora del día después (morning-after pill), píldora del día siguiente (next-day pill), anticonceptivo de emergencia (emergency contraceptive), anticoncepción de urgencia (emergency contraception), Pastillas Anticonceptivas de Emergencia (Emergency Contraceptive Pills), anticoncepción postcoital (post-coital contraception), PAU (ECP), PAU-LNG (ECP-LNG), ulipristal acetate (UPA) and levonorgestrel (LNG).

== Authorization and distribution ==
Article 149.1.16 of the Spanish Constitution grants the national government the exclusive right to regulate pharmaceutical products in Spain. Law 29/2006 regulates the manufacturing guarantees required for medicines intended for human use, and the dispensing conditions of these medicines regulated by the Spanish Agency of Medicines and Medical Devices (AEMPS). It also grants the AEMPS the right to modify conditions relating to prescription and dispensing for reasons related to public health or the defense of health. Royal Decree 1345/2007 was the decree that implemented Law 29/2006, of 26 July.

The distribution of the Emergency Contraceptive Pill (ECP) was authorized by the government led by José María Aznar's Popular Party on 23 March 2001, but policies for its distribution were left to regional governments. The date distribution of ECPs was allowed for use was three months later, in May 2001. The ECP was not among the pharmaceutical products supported by Spain's National Health System, meaning it could be subsidized through social security in any regional health system. The initial cost of emergency contraception for women in a pharmacy was 3,191 pesetas, a profit margin of around 1000%. Before the AEMPS legalized levonorgestrel, an emergency contraceptive method sometimes used off-label cost about 300 pesetas.

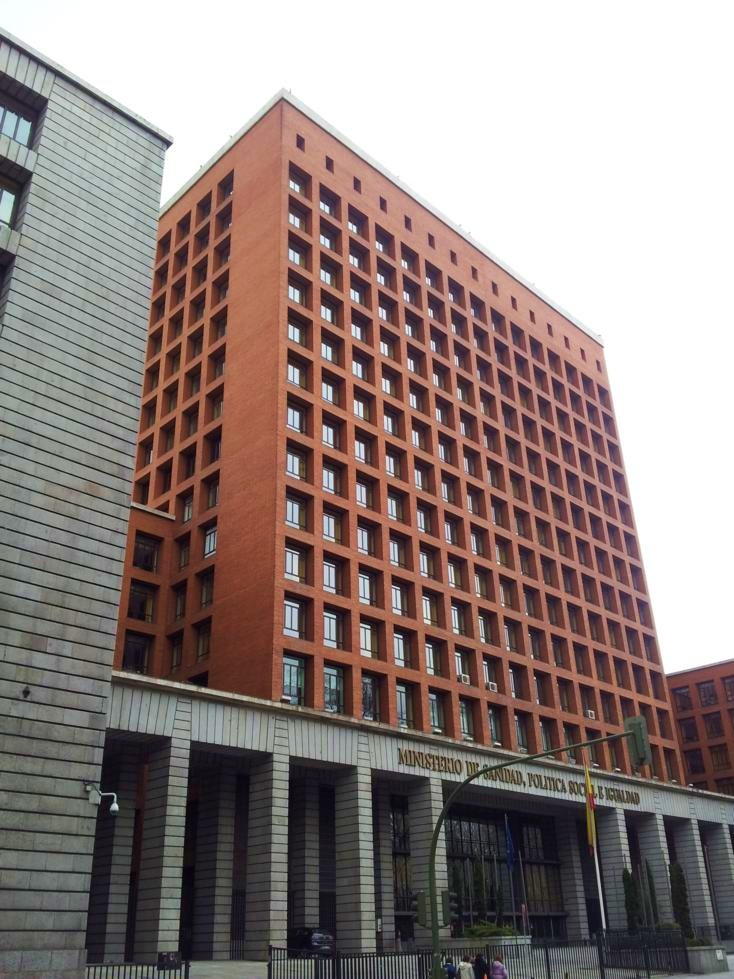
Façade of the Spanish Ministry of Health, in Madrid.

In 2008 there were significant regional differences in how emergency contraception was dispensed in Spain based on regional health policies. There was one Spain where regions like Andalusia, Aragon, Asturias, Cantabria, Castile and León, Navarre, Catalonia, Extremadura and Galicia provided emergency contraception free of charge in public health. There was also another where regional governments did not support its distribution, where women with limited income and adolescents had to pay €20 for an emergency contraceptive after receiving a prescription from a doctor. Therefore, in 2009, the Spanish government authorized the over-the-counter distribution of ECP-LNG to facilitate women's access to the drug and guarantee its effectiveness regardless of their place of residence. The decision was supported by a large percentage of doctors. A 2006 white paper from the Spanish Medical Colleges Organization found that 49.61% of medical professionals in Spain were in favor of providing women with emergency contraception without a prescription. It was also supported by an internal AEMPS report conducted in 2008 and presented to the government in early 2009. The announcement of its sale in pharmacies without a prescription was made on 28 March 2009. The Minister of Health, Trinidad Jiménez, defended the sale at an event at the University Hospital of Ceuta as a way to help women avoid unwanted pregnancies and protect their reproductive rights regardless of where they lived in Spain. The original plan was for the drug to be available in pharmacies in August of that year, but it ended up being delayed by a month.

The AEMPS's Medicines Evaluation Committee (CODEM) was convened in July 2009 regarding the change in status of emergency contraception. The advisory committee was composed of several experts, including a member of the General Council of Official Colleges of Pharmacists (GCOF). They worked on the issue from July to September 2009, when the AEMPS finally authorized the over-the-counter distribution of two levonorgestrel brands, the packages in which they would be sold, the leaflets to be included in them and the dispensing conditions. The final report, two resolutions authorizing their sale, was published on 25 September 2009 having been signed by the Deputy Director General for Human Use Medicines of the AEMPS.

At the time the decision was made to do so, there were forty countries in the world doing the same, fifteen of them located in Europe. The Minister of Equality, Bibiana Aído, stated that after the change, pharmacists should sell emergency contraception. The price was set at around €20 if purchased in a pharmacy. Pills purchased in a pharmacy after the 2009 reform came with three leaflets. One was how to use the pill, another dealt with other contraceptive methods, and the last was about how to prevent transmission of STIs such as HIV. In the initial transition phase, some units still had classification information on their boxes saying they were only available by prescription while manufacturers were in the process of changing. There were no changes to this approved procedure in 2009 as of 2012. In 2017, the average cost of emergency contraception in a pharmacy was €22. This compares to €7 in France.

The National Health Service as of 2009 financed several types of contraceptives. In April 2011, the Ministry of Health, Social Policy and Equality, following a meeting of the Interministerial Commission on Drug Prices, announced that in compliance with Organic Law 2/2010, the maximum permitted price for several contraceptives would be changed. This included monthly prescriptions for oral contraceptives of 21 and 28 tablets where the price would remain the same, two presentations of Dretinee of 21 and 28 tablets (30 mg ethinylestradiol and 3 mg drospirenone) costing €6.34, two presentations of Dretinelle of 21 and 28 tablets (20 mg ethinylestradiol and 3 mg drospirenone) also costing €6.34. It also included quarterly prescriptions for oral contraceptives of 21 and 28 tablets where the price would remain the same, two presentations of Dretinee of 21 and 28 tablets (30 mg ethinylestradiol and 3 mg drospirenone) costing €17.92, two presentations of Dretinelle of 21 and 28 tablets (20 mg ethinylestradiol and 3 mg drospirenone) also costing €17.92. The maximum price for an implant, specifically Implanon NXT containing a progestogen and etonogestrel, would be €97 and would last for three years. Other types of implants had already been funded. Funding was stopped following a decision by the Popular Party-led national government in 2013.

In October 2019, the Ministry of Health, Consumer Affairs and Social Welfare announced that a price reduction for several medications in Spain would occur, with the price reduction taking effect on 1 November 2019. Among the drugs whose prices were officially reduced were levonorgestrel and ethinylestradiol. Of the 1,290 drugs whose prices were reduced, levonorgestrel was among the top ten most used drugs on the list.

Spain's new abortion law of 2022, Organic Law 4/2022, also changed the way women could access the morning-after pill. For the first time, national legislation meant that the pill would be funded by the Ministry of Health and must be given free of charge in health centers and sexual and reproductive health centers throughout the country, in addition to being on sale in all pharmacies. The retail cost of Norvelo and Postinor in 2022 was around €25. It could be as low as €20 and as high as €30 depending on the distributor.

=== Regional distribution ===
Eight regions created guidelines in a short period of time related to how the emergency contraceptive pill should be distributed. They were Andalusia, Aragon, Asturias, Balearic Islands, Cantabria, Catalonia, Galicia and Navarre. Although the national government does not subsidize ECPs through the National Health Service, the Junta de Andalucía decided to cover the cost for residents through its regional health program. In contrast, the Navarre Department of Health, the Catalonia Department of Health and Social Security, the Galicia Department of Health and Social Services, the Basque Country Department of Health, the Health and Social Welfare Commission of the Cortes of Castile and León and the Valencia Department of Health opposed in October 2001 the provision of emergency contraception free of charge in public health.

Andalusia was the first region to offer emergency contraception free of charge in public health centers. This came largely as work carried out by the Spanish Federation of Sexology Societies (FESS), the Spanish Society for Sexology Intervention (SEIS) and the Spanish Association of Sexology Specialists (AEES).

In early 2004, five regional governments (Andalusia, Asturias, Extremadura, Navarre and the Balearic Islands) provided free emergency contraception in more than 1000 public health establishments in the five regions. In April 2004 they were joined by Aragon.

In 2006, emergency contraception was provided free of charge in public health centers in Galicia, the city of Madrid and Extremadura. In April 2009, ten regions provided emergency contraception free of charge with a medical prescription. The regions were Andalusia, Aragon, Asturias, Balearic Islands, Cantabria, Castile and León, Catalonia, Extremadura, Galicia and Navarre. After the Basque Country made Norlevo available to public health for free in June 2008, the only regions that did not fund emergency contraception in Spain were Madrid, Valencia, the Canary Islands and Castile-La Mancha.

When the Ministry of Health and its minister Trinidad Jiménez attended a meeting in Palma de Mallorca with regional health officials in October 2010, she hoped to convince those from the Canary Islands, Castile-La Mancha, Valencia, Melilla, Madrid, Murcia, Navarre and La Rioja to provide emergency contraception free of charge through their local health services. At the same time, Jiménez acknowledged that the National Health System does not fund emergency contraception as it does other medicines. Madrid and Murcia were the only regions in 2016 in Spain that did not subsidize the cost of emergency contraception for women with regional public health funding.

Years in which the Autonomous Communities and Cities had free access to emergency contraception in public health
Region	Year	Decree or law providing access to emergency contraception at no cost to women in public health	Ref.
Andalusia	2001		
Aragon	2005	Order of 3 October 2005 of the Department of Health and Consumption of the Government of Aragon	
Asturias	2004		
Balearic Islands	2008	96/2008 of the Conselleria de Salut y Consum	
Basque Country	2008		
Cantabria	2006		
Castile and León	2007		
Castile-La Mancha	2022	Organic Law 4/2022	
Catalonia	2004		
Ceuta	2022	Organic Law 4/2022	
Extremadura	2004		
Galicia	2009		
Madrid	2017		
Melilla	2022	Organic Law 4/2022	
Navarre	2004	Resolution of the Health Commission, of 11 February 2004	
Valencian Community	2008 2015		

== Manufacturing, marketing, and distribution ==
Authorization for the distribution of emergency contraception took place in May 2001. Norlevo and Postinor were the two brands authorized to sell the morning-after pill in Spain since 2001. Vikela 750 mcg in two tablets and manufactured by Chiesi España, SA and Levonelle 750 mcg in two tablets manufactured by Medimpex (UK) Ltd. were also approved in 2001. Norlevo was a one-pill version, while Postinor was a two-pill version of the drug. Chiesi-Spain manufactured Norlevo while Bayer-Schering-Pharma produced Postinor.

Alcalá Farma and Schering were the first two companies to distribute emergency contraception to pharmacies. Following their decisions, some pharmacies that considered the morning-after pill abortifacient decided to boycott these distributors. The packaging of the Norvelo brand emergency contraception did not include a warning related to the lack of data for the use of ECP-LNG in girls under 16 years of age due to the limited amount of data related to this age group. This contrasted with the design of the Postinor brand of ECP-LNG, which did carry such a warning. Vikela, Norlevo and Postinor were still the only three available in September 2009.

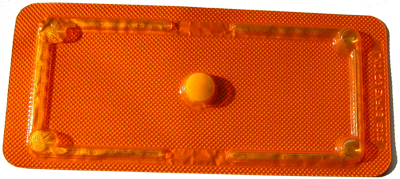
Norlevo one-pill version.

In 2006 only two brands were available: Postinor and Norlevo. Ulipristal acetate (UPA) was approved for distribution as an emergency contraceptive in December 2009 under medical prescription. Unlike earlier types of emergency contraception, it could be used up to five days after unprotected intercourse.

An internal AEMPS report prepared in 2008 in response to a request to distribute emergency contraception over the counter said that the AEMPS opposed manufacturers and distributors marketing emergency contraception to consumers. When the government announced it would provide emergency contraception over the counter, it banned manufacturers and distributors from marketing it. This decision also complied with European regulations.

Between 2009 and 2014, there was a decrease in sales of this type of contraceptive to health centers, which provide the drug free of charge to women who request it, while there was an increase in the number of women accessing the drug through a pharmacist where they had to pay out of pocket.

In 2022 there were three types of emergency contraceptives available in Spain. They were the levonorgestrel pill, the UPA pill and the copper IUD. The copper IUD had the lowest failure rate at 0.09%, while levonorgestrel had a failure rate of between 1.1% taken between 72 and 120 hours after unprotected sex, and the Ulipristal pill had a failure rate of 1.7%. The first two did not require a medical prescription while the copper IUD did.

=== Norlevo ===
The authorized use of NorLevo was modified on 26 April 2006, allowing a single dose of 1,500 mcg. On 11 October 2007, an amendment to the information leaflet regarding safety around breastfeeding was also modified. One of the Norlevo distribution authorization periods was from 17 April 2008 to 16 April 2011. Worldwide, 5,938,801 women took Norlevo from 17 April 2008 to 16 April 2009, 6,868,771 women took Norlevo from 17 April 2009 to 16 April 2010, and 6,200,000 women took Norlevo from 17 April 2010 to 16 April 2011. A total of 19,007,572 women worldwide took Norvelo in that three-year period. Of these, there were 498 cases of adverse reactions, the most common, 33%, being reproductive-related, while 15% were gastrointestinal. The most common adverse reactions included delayed menstruation, metrorrhagia, vomiting, diarrhea and nausea. The 2012 information leaflet made no reference to minors.

=== Postinor ===
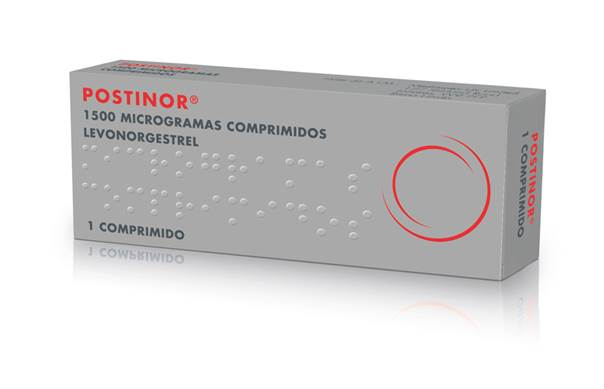
A box of Postinor.

The authorization of Postinor 1,500 mcg was modified on 14 June 2004 following a European mutual recognition procedure. This involved a change in the dispensing conditions, harmonizing packaging throughout the European Union, improving the package leaflet and label, changing the legal representative of the drug, in addition to changing the location of the office where the drug was registered and the legal representatives of the manufacturers. The text was modified in the information leaflet, the translation of which was then approved by the Spanish government.

The laboratory that originally manufactured Postinor disappeared in 2008, when production and manufacturing changed to a new one. In 2008, worldwide, 29,800,000 women took Postinor. In 2009, the total was 30,747,000. In 2010, the total was 29,331,000. In total, over that three-year period, 89,878,000 women took Postinor. Worldwide, in that three-year period, there were 3,995 suspected adverse reactions. The most common of these was pregnancy, accounting for 32% of all adverse reactions. 24% of adverse reactions worldwide included issues related to the reproductive system, including irregular menstruation and metrorrhagia. The information leaflet included in the package referred to minors in 2012. It said it was not recommended for girls under 16 years of age due to lack of data.

=== EllaOne ===
EllaOne was authorized by the European Commission in August 2009. It used the active ingredient ulipristal acetate and was manufactured by Laboratoire HRA Pharma. It works up to five days after intercourse. Unlike emergency contraception with the active ingredient levonorgestrel, this one was determined to be used only under medical supervision and required a prescription to access it throughout the European Union. It was approved in Spain in December 2009 and sold as EllaOne in a 30 mg tablet at a cost of €32.78. Public health did not cover it for free. In 2011 a medical prescription was required to access it.

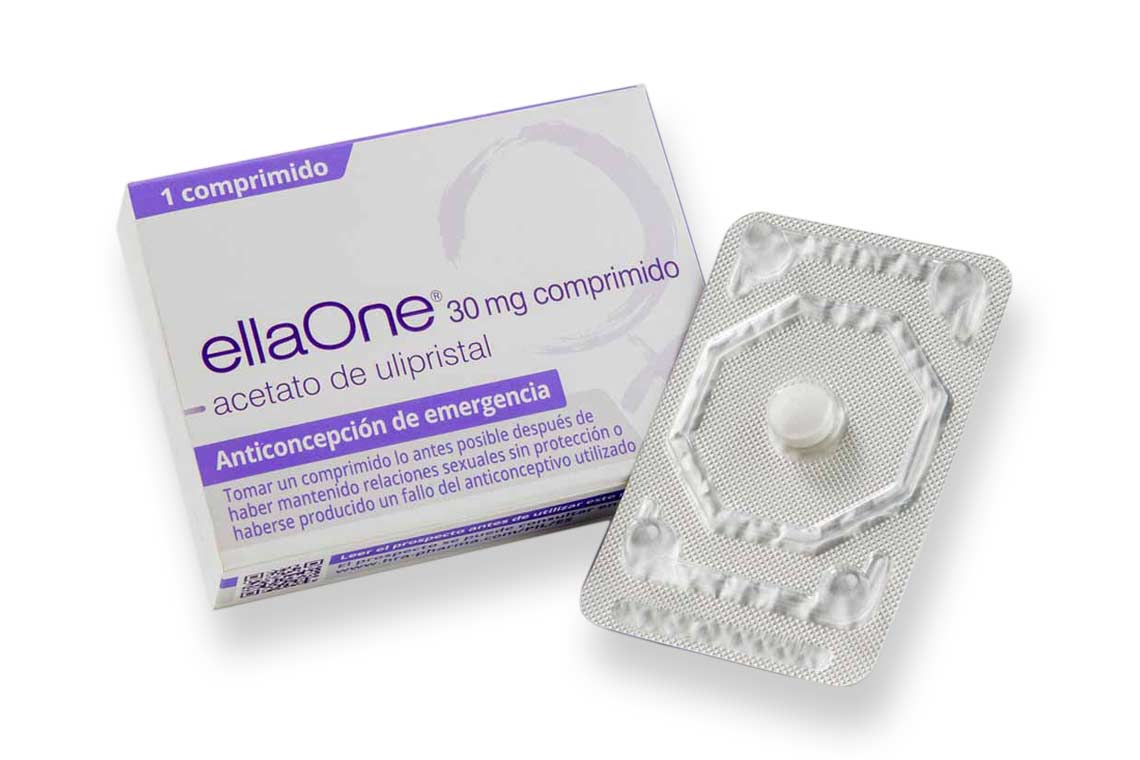
EllaOne was authorized in Spain in December 2009.

The European Medicines Agency changed the information in the EllaOne leaflet a few months after authorizing it in May 2009 to remove a reference to the post-fertilization effect, meaning that the pill could be abortifacient in nature if implantation of an embryo had already occurred. At the same time, the manufacturer of EllaOne said on its website that the drug could alter the endometrium to prevent implantation of a fertilized embryo. This created a contradiction between the European Medicines Agency and the manufacturer regarding how the product worked. In 2013, the Madrid Health Department told the Spanish Social Pharmacy Association (Aefas) that they had requested a modification in EllaOne to match the manufacturer's description. While the Community of Madrid had acted, the EMA and the European Commission had not. EllaOne initially required a prescription, but that changed in 2015 when it became available in pharmacies for the first time without a prescription. The manufacturer's recommended price at that time was €24.90.

The Spanish Agency of Medicines and Medical Devices (AEMPS) withdrew in February 2018 from the market the drug Esmya used to treat women of reproductive age with uterine fibroids after the European Pharmacovigilance Risk Assessment Committee (PRAC) initiated a risk-benefit reassessment following reports of serious liver damage. The active ingredient of the drug was ulipristal acetate, which is also used in EllaOne. The latter drug remained on the market because no cases of serious liver damage related to the use of the drug had been reported and there was no ongoing review related to it.

=== Navela ===
Navela was a morning-after pill available in Spain in 2018 through Exeltis Healthcare S.L. who were based in Azuqueca de Henares, Guadalajara, with the manufacturing address at Laboratorios León Farma, S. A. in Navatejera, León.

== Legislative and ministerial efforts and reactions ==
In the Senate, on 23 November 2004, Convergència i Unió (CiU) urged the Government to inform young women using emergency contraception about the possible iatrogenic effects caused by the use of the drug. CiU cited Article 9 of Law 41/2002 of 14 November on patients with correct information as part of its reason for wanting that information to be included when women were administered the drug. CiU also spoke of the lack of clinical trials with girls aged fourteen and sixteen, a group to whom the drug can legally be prescribed in Spain. CiU presented a motion to legally require that this information be included with the drug.

Esquerra Republicana de Catalunya (ERC) asked the Health and Consumption Commission on 29 May 2007 to approve a non-legislative proposal urging the national government to have the AEMPS present a report within six months on the potential for over-the-counter distribution of emergency contraception, including therapeutic implications, conditions of use, how follow-up care could be coordinated and which age groups might be eligible to receive emergency contraception without a prescription. An internal AEMPS report was prepared in 2008, which was sent to the Ministry's General Secretariat for Health in April 2009. The report offered a favorable risk-benefit analysis for the over-the-counter supply of emergency contraception in pharmacies, especially given the rarity of thrombotic effects. They supported distribution in health centers and pharmacies without a prescription, in addition to developing a multidisciplinary sex education program for minors, monitoring the effectiveness of such education, a separate evaluation on the dispensing of the morning-after pill to minors to see if it resulted in a decrease in other types of contraceptives among young people. The AEMPS also opposed manufacturers and distributors marketing emergency contraception to consumers. In May 2009, the Government decided to distribute emergency contraception over the counter in pharmacies based on the strength of the report.

In June 2009, Convergència i Unió (CiU) led an effort in the Senate to try to prevent the Spanish government from allowing the distribution of emergency contraception in pharmacies without a prescription. They claimed it was a political effort by the PSOE before the elections to try to win votes. CiU presented a motion to prevent the sale of emergency contraception from being distributed in pharmacies without a prescription, which was also supported by the People's Party. The PSOE defended its decision on 10 June 2009 during a Plenary Session in the Senate, with the Commissioner for Health and Consumption, Pedro Villagrán, acting as party spokesman. Also voting against the measure were the PSOE, the Catalan Agreement of Progress, the Galician Nationalist Bloc, the Parliamentary Group of Basque Nationalist Senators and five other senators. Their argument was that facilitating access to emergency contraception would reduce the number of abortions in Spain. The final vote was 128 against and 125 in favor. The Secretary of Social Welfare of the Federal Executive of the PSOE and spokesperson for the Congress of Social Policy Marisol Pérez Tello in May 2009 at a press conference in Melilla accused the People's Party of being hypocritical and having double standards when it comes to providing emergency contraception without a prescription. She said: "You cannot be hypocritical and have double standards, [...] you cannot denounce that Spain has the highest rates of voluntary interruption of pregnancy among young women and adolescents and then not want to introduce sex education in Education for Citizenship or criticize the use of condoms and campaigns for their use." She stressed that emergency contraception "is not an abortifacient method, but an emergency contraceptive method." She also stressed that research on this type of drug shows that it does not cause any harm to women, has no impact on health even if taken more than once, and that the abortion rate can only be solved by educating young people about these issues. On 21 October 2011, the People's Party and Convergència i Unió (CiU) approved a motion in the Senate asking the Government to change the status of emergency contraception from one that does not require a prescription to one that does.

The Minister of Health, Ana Mato, commissioned three reports on the morning-after pill in early 2012. The reports were prepared by the Spanish Agency of Medicines and Medical Devices (AEMPS), the Spanish Medical Colleges Organization (OMC) and the Spanish Society of Gynecology and Obstetrics (SEGO). The conclusions of the reports were not to be made public, nor the methodology used in the reports nor who those agencies consulted to prepare them. In March 2012, Mato told the Health Commission of the Spanish Senate that the reports were inconclusive. As a result, she would create an advisory council to determine whether the morning-after pill should continue to be distributed in pharmacies without a prescription. In August 2012 it was announced that hepatologist and director of the IDIBAPS Health Research Institute at the Hospital Clínic of Barcelona Joan Rodés would head an advisory council that would report to Ana Mato and the Ministry of Health on the possibility of providing women with emergency contraception at no cost and funding for the drug would be provided by the national government. The advisory council was scheduled to report its findings in September 2013.

When the Minister of Justice, Alberto Ruiz-Gallardón, attempted to reform abortion in Spain laws in December 2013, he also attempted to make changes to the law on the use of emergency contraception. This was because many groups fighting for abortion rights were very focused on it, trying to hide it and spreading information suggesting that the use of emergency contraception was harmful to women's health. In response to their activities, feminist groups in Spain tried to counter the misinformation campaigns of anti-abortion groups, especially considering that access to the pill was still very difficult in some regions. One of the feminist goals was to get the national and regional governments to distribute the pill at no cost to women in pharmacies.

== Protocol for the use of emergency contraception ==
In September 2009, the Spanish Society of Community Pharmacy (SEFAC) announced to pharmacies that the process of dispensing emergency contraception involved first informing all staff about the procedure for handling requests for emergency contraception. Then, the individual pharmacist had to handle the request personally or refer the woman requesting emergency contraception to another health professional. Pharmacists were advised to provide girls and women seeking emergency contraception with all the necessary information to enable them to make an informed decision about whether to take it or not. Pharmacists were to tactfully handle a request for emergency contraception, while maintaining the girl's or woman's right to privacy. Pharmacists were to hand over the medication to the person requesting it, unless it was an exceptional case of delivery to another person or requested by medical prescription by medical personnel. Pharmacists could also, where appropriate, advise the girl or woman requesting emergency contraception on other contraceptive options, how to prevent STIs and additional information and places where they could get help. The pharmacist should remind the person requesting emergency contraception that it does not prevent STIs, and that they should go to a health center or emergency room if they suspect possible STI transmission.

The Spanish Society of Gynecology and Obstetrics (SEGO) recommended, in 2015, only ECP-LNG, the emergency oral contraceptive pill, or an IUD to prevent pregnancy in emergency situations. Although the AEMPS approved ulipristal acetate (UPA) in 2009, the protocol still recommended ECP-LNG in 2015 because it had a higher efficacy rate. The dosing protocol consisted of taking a 1.5 mg tablet as soon as possible after unprotected sex. If a woman vomited within three hours of taking it, she should retake the pill as soon as possible.

The SEGO protocol said that women should not take emergency contraception frequently because it increases the chances of adverse side effects, such as depression, migraine, heart palpitations, hypertension, varicose veins, dyspnea, ovarian cysts, benign breast lumps and breast discharge. In 2022, the Spanish Society of Emergency Medicine (SEMES) and SEMESTOX (Clinical Toxicology) recommended that, if women had been victims of sexual abuse by chemical submission, they be given emergency contraception, in addition to being tested for STIs, including HIV, hepatitis B and tetanus.

Regional protocols by autonomous communities and cities for the administration of emergency contraception in public health
Region	Year	Decree or law on access to emergency contraception at no cost to women in public health	Ref.
Andalusia		World Health Organization guidelines	
Aragon	2005	Guide to Prescribing the Morning-After Pill	
Asturias	2008	Document of the Health Service of the Principality of Asturias	
Cantabria	2006	Protocol-Guide for the dispensing of emergency contraception	
Catalonia	2002 2004 2018 2022 2023	Clinical Practice Guide for Emergency Contraception by ICS Emergency Contraception Care Guide. Clinical Practice Guides and Teaching Material Care Plan: Emergency Contraception by Institut Català de la Salut CatSalut Instruction 10/2022, on emergency contraception by Institut Català de la Salut Care Plan: Emergency Contraception review by Institut Català de la Salut	
Galicia	2006	Technical Guide to the contraception process Women's Health Care Plan	
Navarre	2004	Resolution of the Health Commission	
Valencian Community		Action protocols in sexual and reproductive health centers	

== Side effects ==
FEDRA (Spanish Pharmacovigilance, Adverse Reaction Data) was created in 1991 as a central place at the national level to report, evaluate and code adverse drug reactions taking place in Spain. It used MedDRA to standardize different definitions that had been used. The FEDRA database for the period between 2001 and 2011 showed six reported cases of gastrointestinal problems and other non-serious discomforts, one non-serious case of elevated transaminasas, one case with asthenia and anorexia and four cases of gynecological problems including breast pain and problems related to menstruation. Between May 2001 and January 2021, 107 adverse reactions appeared in the FEDRA database. In the same period, the number of adverse reactions to hormonal contraceptives in Spain was 2,735. For all women of childbearing age in that same period, the total number of adverse effects was 64,004. Consequently, adverse effects as a result of using emergency contraception represented 0.17% of all adverse effects from taking a drug in girls and women of childbearing age.

Women of all ages had 237,769 adverse effects in that period. Men, who cannot take emergency contraception or hormonal contraceptives, had 164,392. Between May 2001 and January 2021, 76 cases with 129 adverse effects related to levonorgestrel were recorded. 85.5% were adult women, 1.3% were adolescents and the remaining 13.2% were of unknown age. When age was known, the average age was 27 years and 9 months. The youngest person to suffer an adverse effect from levonorgestrel was 16 years old, while the oldest was 54 years old. 44.2% of reports to FEDRA were made by medical professionals, 27.3% by pharmacists, 26% by girls and women who took it and 2.6% by unspecified health professionals. From May 2001 to January 2021, the most common adverse effects, accounting for 59.4% of all adverse effects, involved disorders of the reproductive organs or breasts, accounting for 18.9% of all reported adverse effects, and 14.5% involved problems inserting or removing an IUD. Gastrointestinal disorders accounted for 7.2% of all adverse effects, while 6.3% affected the nervous system, 2% the vascular system, 0.1% the endocrine system, 0.2% the renal and urinary tract and 0.3% immune system disorders. In the case of serious adverse reactions, 18.5% had to do with the IUD, 10.3% with unwanted pregnancies, 7.5% with the reproductive system and 3.1% with the digestive tract or abdominal pain. One case, 1.7%, involved death as a result of embolisms and peripheral thrombosis.

For the lowest level of adverse effects, 26.4% related to a pregnancy unrelated to the use of emergency contraception, 3.9% involved nausea. The remaining minor adverse effects, 2.3% each, included abdominal pain, asthenia, hyperbilirubinemia, hepatitis and pruritus. Thirty-one adverse reactions, from May 2001 to January 2021, involved ulipristal acetate. When age was known, the mean age was 31 years and 6 months, the median age was 32 and the mode was 19. The youngest woman was 17 years old while the oldest was 46. 54.8% had serious adverse effects while 45.2% were non-serious. 56.3% of adverse effects were reported by women who took ECPs, while 18.8% were reported by medical professionals and another 18.8% by pharmacists, with the remaining 6.3% reported by unspecified health professionals.

In a February 2012 report on the side effects of levonorgestrel, the AEMPS cited a study conducted in the United States that found that adverse reactions in adolescents aged 12 to 16 included nausea, fatigue and vomiting. The cited study also found that this age group could generally use the drug on their own without difficulties, using it correctly and safely, and the use of levonorgestrel also did not increase risky sexual behaviors, STIs or pregnancy.

The AEMPS reported in 2012 that the most common side effects of taking levonorgestrel were nausea, headache, dizziness, fatigue, gastrointestinal pain, bleeding, delayed menstruation, heavy menstruation, and increased breast tenderness. These side effects were listed in an information leaflet that came with the package in Spain. There did not appear to be different side effects according to any specific age cut-off point.

In 2012, a study was being carried out related to the dispensing of emergency contraception and the side effects of emergency contraception in all night pharmacies in Valladolid. Among the 200 women who used it in the study, no serious adverse reactions were reported. For EllaOne, with the active ingredient Ulipristal, the most common side effects were abdominal pain and menstrual disorders.

Total adverse effects (serious side effects) reported by FEDRA by region and year
Region/Year	2001	2002	2003	2004	2005	2006	2007	2008	2009	2010	2011	Total	Ref.
Andalusia	0(0)	2(2)	1(1)	2(2)	3(0)	1(1)	0(0)	0(0)	1(0)	0(0)	1(0)	11(6)	
Aragon	0(0)	0(0)	0(0)	0(0)	0(0)	0(0)	0(0)	1(0)	0(0)	1(1)	2(1)	4(2)	
Asturias	0(0)	0(0)	0(0)	0(0)	1(0)	0(0)	0(0)	0(0)	0(0)	1(0)	0(0)	2(0)	
Balearic Islands	1(0)	0(0)	0(0)	0(0)	0(0)	0(0)	0(0)	0(0)	0(0)	0(0)	0(0)	1(0)	
Canary Islands	0(0)	0(0)	0(0)	0(0)	0(0)	0(0)	0(0)	0(0)	0(0)	0(0)	0(0)	0(0)	
Cantabria	0(0)	0(0)	0(0)	0(0)	0(0)	0(0)	0(0)	0(0)	0(0)	0(0)	0(0)	0(0)	
Castile and León	0(0)	0(0)	0(0)	0(0)	0(0)	0(0)	0(0)	1(0)	0(0)	0(0)	0(0)	1(0)	
Castile-La Mancha	0(0)	0(0)	0(0)	0(0)	0(0)	0(0)	0(0)	1(1)	1(1)	0(0)	0(0)	2(2)	
Catalonia	0(0)	1(1)	1(0)	1(1)	0(0)	0(0)	0(0)	0(0)	0(0)	0(0)	0(0)	3(2)	
Ceuta	0(0)	0(0)	0(0)	0(0)	0(0)	0(0)	0(0)	0(0)	0(0)	0(0)	0(0)	0(0)	
Extremadura	0(0)	0(0)	0(0)	0(0)	0(0)	0(0)	0(0)	0(0)	0(0)	1(1)	0(0)	1(1)	
Galicia	0(0)	1(0)	0(0)	0(0)	0(0)	0(0)	0(0)	0(0)	0(0)	0(0)	0(0)	1(0)	
La Rioja	0(0)	0(0)	1(1)	1(1)	0(0)	0(0)	0(0)	0(0)	0(0)	0(0)	0(0)	2(2)	
Madrid	1(1)	0(0)	0(0)	1(1)	1(0)	0(0)	0(0)	1(1)	2(1)	1(1)	0(0)	7(5)	
Melilla	0(0)	0(0)	0(0)	0(0)	0(0)	0(0)	0(0)	0(0)	0(0)	0(0)	0(0)	0(0)	
Region of Murcia	0(0)	0(0)	0(0)	0(0)	0(0)	0(0)	0(0)	0(0)	0(0)	0(0)	0(0)	0(0)	
Valencian Community	0(0)	0(0)	0(0)	0(0)	0(0)	0(0)	0(0)	0(0)	0(0)	0(0)	0(0)	0(0)	
Total	2(1)	4(3)	3(2)	5(5)	5(0)	1(1)	0(0)	4(2)	4(2)	4(3)	3(1)	35(20)	

=== Extremely rare side effects ===
The AEMPS reported in 2012 that only 12 cases of suspected thromboembolic disease had been reported worldwide among the 150 million women who had used emergency contraception. Most of these women had venous thromboembolism or a family history suggestive of thrombophilia.

In the first eleven years that emergency contraception was available in Spain, only 35 cases of adverse effects as a result of taking the drug were reported. All cases occurred with women who had pre-existing health conditions that made them more susceptible to adverse effects.

A cerebral infarction allegedly occurred in 2011 as a side effect of the use of emergency contraception by a 23-year-old woman, being treated at the University Hospital La Paz. She had a family history of strokes. Some doctors like the professor of gynecology at the University of the Basque Country and head of the Gynecology service at Quirón Bizkaia Hospital, Gorka Barrenetxea, questioned the possibility of that happening and the report because progestins do not cause that type of side effect.

From 2001 to 2011, FEDRA data showed serious adverse reactions related to emergency contraception. Of these, fourteen were unwanted pregnancies, one was an ectopic pregnancy and one involved a 30-year-old woman who reported acute abdomen, abdominal pain and vaginal bleeding. In March 2003, a 16-year-old girl suffered cerebral venous thrombosis of the straight and right transverse sinus, where at the time of admission she reported having tonic-clonic seizures and during a patient study she was found to have a significant protein C deficiency. In May 2010, a woman with a history of migraine without aura, live birth, seven miscarriages and a family history of cerebral stroke was admitted to the emergency room after taking emergency contraception due to decreased strength and sensitivity in the right hemibody. Two 22-year-old women reported having superficial thrombophlebitis of the upper extremities within 72 hours of taking emergency contraception. In June 2004, a 19-year-old girl went to the emergency room due to thrombophlebitis in a leg within 72 hours of taking emergency contraception. She recovered after eight days and was discharged after anticoagulant treatment. In 2007, a 35-year-old woman was reported to have lower extremity phlebitis after taking emergency contraception; she was a smoker with elevated homocysteine and obesity. In October 2008, the case of a 37-year-old woman who took the morning-after pill for 22 days was reported; she was eventually diagnosed with thrombotic thrombocytopenic purpura and discharged from hospital after twenty days under her care. In September 2011, a 28-year-old woman with a history of eating disorders requiring emergency room intervention was reported to have acute porphyria, inappropriate HAD secretion and seizures after taking emergency contraception.

In the FEDRA database there were two cases of adverse effects in which levonorgestrel played a role as a result of drug interactions. These were a case of hepatitis and hyperbilirubinemia due to a possible interaction between Loette, Paroxetine and Norlevo. The other was a possible drug interaction between lamotrigine and levonorgestrel that likely led to an epileptic seizure.

== Laws governing use by minors ==
Spain has multiple laws governing the use of emergency contraception by minors. While parents generally hold parental authority as legal representatives, unemancipated minors may consent independently to medical treatment, including access to emergency contraception depending on their age and maturity level.

According to the civil code (Article 162), parents have the right to act as the legal representative of unemancipated minors except when a conflict of interest arises or when the minor possesses sufficient maturity regarding personality rights.

In 1996, Spain passed the Organic Law on the legal protection of minors and in 1999 adopted the Convention on Human Rights and Biomedicine. These codes prioritize the "best interests of the minor," granting them the right to receive age-appropriate information, be heard, and participate directly in decisions affecting them.

The Patient Autonomy Law (Law 41/2002 of 14 November) expressly mandates that medical consent be voluntary and informed. For minors under 12, parents or guardians have to give consent by proxy, but the law still requires them to listen to the child's opinion first.

Patients themselves cannot give consent and consent must be given by proxy when a patient is legally incapacitated, if a doctor determines, based on their physical or mental state at a particular time, that they are not competent to make a decision about their own health, and they are not emancipated or do not have sufficient maturity. Those giving proxy consent must always put the patient's needs and dignity first. Documentation must also be created in situations where someone is declared incapable of making decisions for themselves by creating a declaration of incapacity.

== Access points for obtaining emergency contraception ==
Between 2009 and 2014, there was a decrease in sales of emergency contraceptives to health institutions, which provide the drug free of charge to women who request it, while there was an increase in the number of women accessing the drug through a pharmacist where they had to pay for emergency contraceptives out of pocket.

In November 2004, there were only five regions in Spain where women could obtain emergency contraception free of charge with a medical prescription in public health. They were Andalusia, Extremadura, Asturias, Navarre and the Balearic Islands. In April 2009, there were ten regions providing emergency contraception free of charge with a public health prescription. The regions were Andalusia, Aragon, Asturias, Balearic Islands, Cantabria, Castile and León, Catalonia, Extremadura, Galicia and Navarre. In September 2009, the Basque Country became the last region to add it to its public health portfolio. At the end of 2009, around 2,000 of the more than 21,000 pharmacies in Spain refused to sell emergency contraception.

== Access issues ==
When the pill first became available in Spain in 2001, it was often difficult for women to access. Some young women, prior to the change in the law, also had problems accessing emergency contraception because they needed the consent of a parent or guardian to obtain it. 17% of women requesting emergency contraception in Spain in 2003 were unable to get it when they requested it from their doctor, so they had to try to get it from another doctor, or at another hospital or health center.

In the mid-2000s, it was not uncommon for women throughout Spain to have difficulty accessing emergency contraception. Sometimes hospitals had internal policies that denied women access to prescriptions for the morning-after pill, some hospital doctors were conscientious objectors, some pharmacies refused to stock it and some individual pharmacists were conscientious objectors. Some doctors were also reluctant to prescribe it to minors, despite the fact that they could legally do so without a guardian's permission.

In the 2000s, there were access problems to emergency contraception for girls and women in the province of Salamanca. In general, most contraceptives were not funded by the regional or national government. When girls and women went to their local health centers, doctors could provide them with sex education related to contraception, birth control and other sexual and reproductive health topics due to the brevity of the visit. Girls and women who went to emergency care centers attached to their local health center were concerned about privacy and record keeping of their request for that medication.

In 2011, women were more likely to experience difficulties accessing emergency contraception in a public health center than in a pharmacy. 11.3% of girls and women in Spain had difficulty accessing emergency contraception that year. This varied by region, with 18.4% of girls and women in Madrid having difficulty accessing emergency contraception that year. 11.7% in Spain were not provided it free of charge at a health center that should have done so. 2.3% of girls and women in Spain were denied access to emergency contraception because they were told it had been too long since the risky intercourse took place.

In 2013, 3.3% of women seeking emergency contraception had difficulty accessing it. This represented a significant decrease from two years earlier, when the rate was 11.3%. 12.5% of problems recorded related to access to emergency contraception in 2013 took place in family planning centers, while 2.4% took place in pharmacies and 2.2% in primary health care. 35.2% of women who had problems finding it in pharmacies went to another pharmacy to try to get emergency contraception.

In 2022, biases and specific preferences related to specific types of contraceptive methods by public health medical professionals could sometimes be a problem for women accessing emergency contraception and other contraceptive methods in Spanish public health.

=== Misinformation ===
A 2011 survey by the Spanish Society of Contraception found that 53.4% of women thought emergency contraception was abortifacient despite not being so. In the late 2010s, a major barrier to accessing emergency contraception was the amount of misinformation accessed about its use. Another misinformation was that it would lead to a decrease in the birth rate in Spain. This turned out to be false.

Misinformation was spread that the widespread use of emergency contraception in Spanish society would lead to couples engaging in higher-risk sexual activities and increase the risk of contracting STIs. This claim was spread despite there being no evidence for it and a study showing that the two activities were unrelated. That study showed that, on the contrary, 96.7% of couples did not stop using emergency contraception.

=== Need for a prescription ===
Javier Martínez Salmeán, head of Gynecology at the Severo Ochoa University Hospital in Madrid, said in May 2009 that the need for a prescription to access emergency contraception contributed to access problems. Martínez Salmeán was a member of an expert committee that advised the Spanish government when they were drafting changes to Spain's abortion laws that year. Women who needed prescriptions for contraceptives and emergency contraception in 2022 continued to have a barrier to access in some cases. In 2010, the need to ask for a prescription to get the morning-after pill for free in public health caused a lot of embarrassment for some girls and women and created access problems. Around 51.9% of women who tried to buy contraceptives or emergency contraception without a prescription in 2022 had their request denied by a pharmacist. The need for a prescription for EllaOne between 2009 and 2015 created an access problem, because girls and women first needed to get the prescription and then go to a pharmacy and buy it.

=== Pregnancy tests ===
In the mid-2000s, it was especially difficult for women in rural areas of Aragon to access the morning-after pill. Some women had access problems because their doctors required them to have a pregnancy test before administering the morning-after pill. Some doctors seemed to do so for health reasons, while others did so for moral reasons. It created an additional access barrier because pregnancy tests were not always immediately available or they had to leave the health center to go to a pharmacy to get a pregnancy test, take it, and then return before a doctor would dispense the emergency contraception. Young girls and women in the province of Zamora, some doctors required them to have a pregnancy test in the early and mid-2000s before they were willing to prescribe emergency contraception.

=== Pharmacy and health center hours and locations ===
In the mid-2000s, it was especially difficult for women in rural areas of Aragon to access the morning-after pill. Although the region had 731 municipalities, not all of them had health centers or other types of health establishments open 24 hours a day. The lack of 24-hour pharmacies and nearby medical centers in the province of León led to access problems in the late 2010s and early 2020s.

=== COVID-19 pandemic in Spain ===
During the first year of the COVID-19 pandemic in Spain, from March 2020 to March 2021, only 3% of women of childbearing age in Spain used emergency contraception. This was the lowest percentage of women using it since 2009, when it became available in pharmacies without a prescription. It was also a period when women in Spain had one of the lowest numbers of sexual intercourse in recent history. Women who bought emergency contraception during the pandemic were mostly between 20 and 25 years old, and only a very small percentage were under 18. Most had stable partners and the couple did not want children at the time. HRA Pharma sold around 540,000 units of emergency contraceptives, including EllaOne, in 2020. This was less than an average of 600,000 units sold per year over the previous five years.

The COVID-19 pandemic in Spain also created a number of access problems related to closures and lockdowns. Women who needed free prescriptions often encountered difficulties when trying to get appointments with public health doctors who could prescribe emergency contraception. When women contacted doctors who prescribed them, many tried to encourage them to use long-acting types of contraceptives, such as the IUD, to try to prevent women from returning multiple times to public health for contraceptive purposes. Access to contraceptives, including access to emergency contraception, became more difficult in Spain during the pandemic because some immigrants did not speak the language well enough and did not know the health system. It made it difficult to access these medications.

The pandemic impacted women's sex lives, especially in Andalusia. 52.7% of women in Spain had unprotected sex during this period, with this figure being 59.3% in Andalusia. During the pandemic, 65% of girls and women between 16 and 34 in Andalusia reported having sex at least once a week. 40% said that girls and women in Andalusia said their sex lives had become more difficult, and that girls and women no longer bought contraceptives for a number of reasons, such as financial difficulties as a result of the pandemic, lockdown restrictions making it more difficult to leave home to go to a pharmacy to buy contraceptives or see a gynecologist.

The León Family Planning Center, located on Frontón Street in León, provided the morning-after pill free of charge, but only in cases of financial hardship because the drug was not funded by social security. It was also forced to close during the hard lockdown. It finally reopened its doors in June 2020, operating five days a week and began operating normally again in September 2020.

=== Conscientious objection ===
Although emergency contraception is not abortifacient, some medical professionals still consider it abortifacient. As a result, their objection to emergency contraception on those grounds has created barriers to access for girls and women.

In the 2000s, there were access problems to emergency contraception for girls and women in the province of Salamanca. Girls and women also had to worry about conscientious objectors both at their health center and at their local pharmacy denying them access to emergency contraception, citing moral reasons. Young girls and women in the province of Zamora encountered similar problems with doctors claiming that emergency contraception was abortifacient when at the time it was not legally considered so.

Conscientious objection, especially among Catholic doctors who considered emergency contraception abortifacient, was an obstacle for girls and women in Catalonia in the early 2000s to access emergency contraception. In the mid-to-late 2000s, some pharmacies did not sell condoms or emergency contraception because they were conscientious objectors. The 2009 law change requiring pharmacies to stock it aimed to alleviate this problem. In 2009, women throughout Spain often had problems accessing emergency contraception because doctors and pharmacists denied them access, claiming they were conscientious objectors. At that time, there were around 21,000 pharmacies in Spain and the government said in relation to the new abortion law that women could simply go to a nearby pharmacist if one refused to sell to them.

The Minister of Equality, Bibiana Aído, stated that after the change, pharmacists must sell emergency contraception. The Faculties of Pharmacy in different parts of Spain disagreed, citing the right to conscientious objection. 4,000 pharmacists signed a letter in 2009 addressed to the Minister of Health of Spain, Trinidad Jiménez, to say that they opposed pharmacists being asked to distribute emergency contraception.

The Red Farmacia Responsable (Responsible Pharmacy Network) was created in response to the Ministry of Health's announcement in March 2009 that emergency contraception would be available in pharmacies without a prescription. Members believed it was irresponsible to dispense it that way or without parental knowledge. The group advised pharmacists on how to oppose its handling.

In Spain in 2011, 25% of people with difficulty accessing emergency contraception did not receive it at a pharmacy and had to go to another one. The rate was higher in Madrid, with 27.7%. 40.7% in Spain were denied access at a health center. The percentage was much higher in Madrid where 63.8% were denied emergency contraception in public health. In Spain, 6.2% were referred by public health to a pharmacy instead of being provided with emergency contraception.

In 2015, fourteen pharmacies and seventeen pharmacists in Catalonia, out of a total of 3,100 pharmacies in the region, had declared themselves conscientious objectors to the distribution of emergency contraception. No pharmacy in the province of Lleida is among the fourteen in Catalonia in 2015 that refused to sell emergency contraception. This includes pharmacies in Ponent.

A survey conducted in 2022 by Torre de Barcelona of different pharmacies in Barcelona found that many pharmacists in the Eixample district believed that emergency contraception should only be distributed with a medical prescription. As of October 2022, pharmacies in Barcelona's Eixample, Sarrià-Sant Gervasi, Les Corts and throughout Spain were required to provide emergency contraception free of charge to women who requested it. Pharmacists who oppose the distribution of emergency contraception could, as a result of the new national legislation, be fined up to one million euros.

Pharmacists in the Community of Madrid discussed the new 2022 national women's reproductive rights law that required pharmacists to stock and dispense emergency contraception or face fines of between €90,000 and €1 million. Among the group members were pharmacists from Lavapiés, Embajadores, Puerta del Ángel and Acacias. The discussion was heated because many pharmacists had strong opinions on the matter and some did not plan to stock or dispense it despite the consequences.

Laws and legal precedents regulating conscientious objection and affecting the distribution of emergency contraception
Region	Year	Who it applies to	Law	Ref.
Spain	2015	Pharmacists	Constitutional Court Judgment 145/2015, of 25 June Article 16 of the Spanish Constitution	
Andalusia	2007	Pharmacists	Judgment of the High Court of Justice of Andalusia of 8 January 2007	
Cantabria	2001	Pharmacists	Law 7/2001 of 19 December on pharmaceutical regulation of Cantabria	
Castile-La Mancha	2005	Pharmacists	Law 5/2005 of 27 June on the Regulation of the Pharmaceutical Service of Castile-La Mancha	
Catalonia	1991	Pharmacists	Law 31/91, of 13 December, on Pharmaceutical Regulation	
Galicia	1999	Pharmacists	Law 5/1999 of 21 May on Pharmaceutical Regulation of Galicia	
La Rioja	1998	Pharmacists	Law 8/1998 of 16 June on Pharmaceutical Regulation of the Autonomous Community of La Rioja	
Navarre	2000	Pharmacists	Article 11.2 of Law 12/2000, of 16 November	

=== Education ===
Lack of education about emergency contraception, both by women and health professionals, has been a barrier to accessing the drug. In 2021, one of the prevailing myths in Spain was that emergency contraception could only be taken within 24 hours of unprotected sex. The reality is that the morning-after pill can be taken up to five days after having unprotected sex. The lack of education caused some girls and women not to seek emergency contraception.

=== Data tracking ===
When a woman who had access to public health requested emergency contraception in 2008, depending on the region, data was often placed on her SIP card to allow her to request it and store the information in the regional health system. In 2008, some regions had their own records that collected minimal information, such as who prescribed the drug, where it was prescribed, number associated with the center where it was prescribed, date prescribed, age of the woman obtaining the prescription, how many times the woman had previously used emergency contraception, how long ago she had last taken it if she had used it before, and sometimes other personally identifying information. The type of data collected from one region to another was not homogeneous, as there was no national standard regarding the recording of emergency contraception administration as there was for abortion in Spain. Sometimes the type of data requested seemed to conflict with Spain's data protection laws despite the obligations of professional secrecy. This unsettled some women because they felt that such data violated their privacy. Girls and women in the province of Salamanca who went to emergency care centers attached to their local health center in the 2000s were concerned about privacy and record keeping of their request for that medication.

=== Opposition to emergency contraception ===
There were some groups that actively opposed more liberal access to emergency contraception and tried to encourage local, regional and national political leaders to restrict access to it in general or among certain groups, such as minors. At the national level, these groups included the Catholic Church and the Catholic Confederation of Parents of Students (Concapa). The Catholic Church considered emergency contraception to be abortifacient and that taking it was tantamount to committing murder. These groups sometimes spread misinformation about emergency contraception, such as that it worsens women's health or reduces their chances of getting pregnant later.

On 27 April 2001, the Spanish Episcopal Conference issued a statement on emergency contraception. It stated that it was not a medicine and that it harmed women due to the high doses of hormones administered. It criticized the government for diverting resources from health services to fund a drug that does not improve the health of Spanish citizens. It also stated that the morning-after pill was not a contraceptive because it did not prevent conception, but rather the egg from implanting in the lining of the uterus. It further stated that emergency contraception was a new form of early abortion that destroys human life in the first phase of development.

In May 2009, the Spanish Episcopal Conference (CEE) issued a statement in response to an announcement by the national government that emergency contraception would soon be available in pharmacies without a prescription, saying that the CEE considers emergency contraception a form of abortion, and not simply a type of contraception. They also said that emergency contraception had negative consequences for the health of girls and women who took it.

Derecho a Vivir, Hazte Oír, Médicos por la Vida and Provida Madrid organized a march on 27 October 2009 that stretched from Madrid's Puerta del Sol to the Puerta de Alcalá to protest changes to Spain's abortion law and the fact that women, and specifically girls under the age of 18, could now request emergency contraception at a pharmacy without a prescription.

The Balearic Family Policy Institute (IPF) claimed in November 2010 that emergency contraception "is being used regularly as a contraceptive by women in the Balearic Islands." Furthermore, they stated, "it can entail serious complications for women's health and, above all, its sale to minors, since girls are not asked for their ID at the time of dispensing."

=== Feminist and reproductive rights activism ===
Feminists in Madrid supported the May 2009 law change that made emergency contraception available without a prescription, along with the requirement that all pharmacies stock it, because emergency contraception was a form of contraception and not a form of abortion. Representatives of the Madrid Feminist Assembly spoke to the media about their support for the decision in May 2009.

In 2009, the Canarian Society of Contraception (SCC) said that the government should subsidize contraception in the Canary Islands to help reduce the number of teenage pregnancies. They also stressed that emergency contraception is not abortifacient, but rather a form of contraception that should only be used on rare occasions, and that increased use of emergency contraception could decrease abortions by 70%.

On 10 February 2011 at the Complutense University of Madrid (UCM), the Spanish Society of Contraception and Chiesi España launched a campaign called Píldora del Día Anterior (The Day Before Pill). The goal of the campaign was to reduce the number of unwanted pregnancies and sexually transmitted diseases among young people. It consisted of distributing boxes with a dummy pill and a leaflet that talked about the contraceptive methods that students could access at the university.

The Spanish Society of Contraception and the Spanish Foundation for Contraception launched a campaign in September 2011 on the consequences of unprotected sex among young people, including the fact that Spain had around 11,000 abortions per year and that the percentage of people with sexually transmitted infections was increasing throughout Spain. The campaign was launched at the Complutense University of Madrid, where they planned to distribute 5,000 units of emergency contraception free of charge to students. On 8 March 2012, International Women's Day, more than 1,000 women took to the streets of Valladolid to demand women's equality. Among their demands was easier access to emergency contraception.
