= Abortion in Spain =

Abortion in Spain is legal upon request up to 14 weeks of pregnancy, and at later stages in cases of risk to the life or health of the woman or serious fetal defects.

Abortion legislation in Spain has a fluctuating history. During the 1930s, abortion laws were liberalized in the area controlled by the Republicans, but this was short-lived, as the Franco regime, with support of the Catholic Church, criminalized abortion again. The laws were relaxed in 1985, and were further liberalized in 2010. Abortion remains a controversial political issue in Spain, but regular moves to restrict it have lacked majority support. In recent years, abortion rates have been falling, as better access to emergency contraception in Spain has been introduced.

== Overview ==
Voluntary interruption of pregnancy (induced abortion) in Spain is regulated under Title II of the Organic Law 2/2010 of sexual and reproductive health and abortion which came into force on 5 July 2010 and legalizes abortion during the first 14 weeks of pregnancy.

Under the previous laws, authors such as Ibáñez and García Velasco argued that prohibition and criminalization of abortion failed to prevent about 100,000 abortions a year. Thus, punishment did not save the unborn, but did contribute decisively to the deaths of women who had obtained illegal, unsanitary abortions (200 to 400 women in 1976, according to a Supreme Court document). Moreover, advocates of legal abortion argue, the problem of hiding mainly affects poor women, as those with more resources would have traveled to other countries to get an abortion, a practice known as "abortion tourism".

Opponents of abortion, including the Catholic Church, counter that it is the taking of innocent human life, an inherently evil and murderous practice which degrades respect for all life and leads society toward a culture of death. The conservative People's Party in June 2010 filed an action against several provisions of law to the Constitutional Court. In the electoral program for the general election held on 20 November 2011, the People's Party included modifying the law on abortion.

Still, both supporters and opponents of legalization put the bulk of their argument in defense of life, either of the mother or of the unborn child. Virtually all Spanish people interviewed have favored more social awareness of abortion and the need for the government to regulate it.

== Second Spanish Republic ==
On 25 December 1936, in Catalonia, elective abortion was legalized during the first 12 weeks of pregnancy, with a decree signed by Josep Tarradellas on 9 January 1937 (Diari Oficial de la Generalitat de Catalunya, núm.9).

In 1937, over the area loyal to the Republic during the Spanish Civil War under the socialist Spanish Socialist Workers' Party (PSOE) government of Francisco Largo Caballero, the Catalan Minister of Health, Federica Montseny (anarchist CNT), also legalized abortion. The law was repealed by the victorious Francisco Franco.

== Organic Law 9/1985 ==
In the Organic Law 9/1985 adopted on 5 July 1985, induced abortion was legalized in three cases: serious risk to the physical or mental health of the pregnant woman (therapeutic justification), rape (criminal justification), and malformations or defects, physical or mental, in the fetus (eugenic justification).

According to this law, the mother could terminate the pregnancy in public or private health centres in the first 12 weeks for reasons related to rape, in the first 22 weeks for eugenic reasons, and at any time during pregnancy for therapeutic reasons. In the second and third cases, a medical report was required to certify compliance with the legal conditions; in cases of rape, a police report was required. In these three cases, abortion was not punishable under a doctor's supervision in a medical establishment approved for abortions, with the express consent of the woman. In other cases, the Penal Code provided various terms of imprisonment for both mothers and doctors who performed abortions outside the law.

== Organic Law 2/2010 ==
On 3 March 2010, the Organic Law 2/2010 on sexual and reproductive health and abortion was promulgated. The law is to ensure fundamental rights regarding sexual and reproductive health established by the World Health Organization (WHO), regulating the conditions of abortion and establishing the corresponding obligations of public authorities. It came into force on 5 July 2010.

In Title II, Articles 13 and 14, abortion is legalized during the first 14 weeks of pregnancy. During this time, the woman can take a free and informed decision on the termination of her pregnancy with no third party intervention.

Article 15 describes that abortion is allowed up to 22 weeks of pregnancy in cases of "serious risks to life or health of the mother or fetus". From the 22nd week, pregnancy may be interrupted only if "fetal anomalies incompatible with life are detected" or if "an extremely serious and incurable disease is detected within the fetus at the time of diagnosis and is confirmed by a clinical committee".

=== Articles 13 and 14 of Title II of Law 2/2010 ===
Article 13. Common requirements. These are the requirements of the voluntary termination of pregnancy:

1. It is practiced by a physician or under ones supervision.
2. It takes place in an accredited public or private health center.
3. It is done with the express written consent of the pregnant woman or, where appropriate, the legal representative, in accordance with the provisions of Law 41/2002, Basic Regulating Patient Autonomy and Rights and Obligations regarding information and clinical documentation. Express consent may be waived in the case provided for in Article 9.2.b) of that Act
4. For women aged 16 to 17 years, consent to the abortion lies exclusively with them in accordance with the general arrangements for older women. At least one of the legal representatives, parent, people with parental or guardian of women between these ages must be informed of the decision of the women.

This information may be dispensed with when the minor reasonably claims that this will cause a serious conflict, manifested in certain danger of family violence, threats, coercion, abuse, or a situation of homelessness.

Article 14. Termination of pregnancy at the request of the woman.

Pregnancy can be terminated within the first fourteen weeks of gestation at the request of the pregnant woman, provided that these requirements have been followed:

a) the pregnant woman has been informed on the rights, benefits and public aid to mothers, on the terms set forth in paragraphs 2 and 4 of Article 17 of this Act

b) the pregnant woman has completed a period of at least three days, from the moment the information was given to her mentioned in the previous paragraph to the realization of the intervention.

== Approval process of the new law ==
In 2009, a reform of the 1985 law that regulated abortion was processed based on three cases delimited by a new law that would permit, under any circumstances, intervention during the first 14 weeks of gestation, and until week 22 if there is serious risk to the life or health of the pregnant woman or risk of serious abnormalities to the fetus. In case of detection of fetal anomalies incompatible with life, there would be no time limit for abortion. The new law would also allow young people between 16 and 17 to have an abortion without requiring parental consent.

This reform, supported by the Spanish Socialist Party and endorsed by the Council of State, drew criticism from the conservative People's Party, the Catholic Church and anti-abortion groups.

Law 2/2010 of sexual and reproductive health and abortion was finally passed by 184 votes in favor, 158 against, and one abstention. The law was supported by PSOE, the ruling party of Spain, led by Jose Luis Rodriguez Zapatero, and the Minister for Equality, Bibiana Aido. The parties that supported the government were the Basque Nationalist Party (PNV), Republican Left of Catalonia (ERC), United Left (IU), Initiative for Catalonia Greens (ICV), Galician Nationalist Bloc (BNG), Nafarroa Bai, and two members of Convergence and Union (CiU).

The People's Party was the only party that opposed the adoption of the new law. It was also opposed by some members of other parties, such as the Canarian Coalition, Navarrese People's Union (UPN), Union, Progress, and Democracy (UPyD), and seven MPs from CiU. Outside parliament civil society organizations also expressed their rejection: representatives of the Spanish Episcopal Conference of the Catholic Church, Pro Life Associations and the Institute for Family Policies (IPF). In 2009, a survey on Spanish youth conducted by the Sociological Research Center or Centro de Investigaciones Sociológicas indicated that 55% of young people felt that it was only the woman who should decide the issue, one in four believed that society should place certain limits, while 15% objected to abortion in all cases.

== Amendments proposed by the People's Party government of Mariano Rajoy ==
In January 2012, Alberto Ruiz-Gallardón, Minister of Justice for the new conservative People's Party (PP) government led by Mariano Rajoy, announced at his first appearance in parliament his intention to reform the Abortion Law of 2010. This act had been passed by the Socialist government of Rodriguez Zapatero, establishing gestation-age-limited model favoured by most European countries, but was contested by the Catholic Church in Spain and the PP, especially on the issue of whether minors between 16 and 18 may abort without parental consent. The new government proposed to return to the model of the 1982 Act, in which women had to argue the grounds for their decision to abort.

On 20 December 2013, the Government of Spain published its final draft law on abortion: Women undergoing abortion were to be considered "victims", and the practice would only be lawful in the case of rape or when there was a serious (but as yet undefined) health risk to the mother or the fetus. The likelihood of a child being born with disabilities would not be an acceptable justification for abortion.

Under the new law, women under 18 would require parental consent and parental accompaniment during relevant consultations. Those seeking abortion in Spain would need approval from two independent doctors who would not be permitted to participate in the actual procedure.

The Spanish Association of Accredited Abortion Clinics estimated that about 100,000 of the 118,000 abortions carried out in 2012 would be illegal under the new legislation. The revision was part of the 2011 PP election manifesto which was strongly influenced by the Roman Catholic church and vigorously opposed by most opposition parties and women's groups, who saw it as an attack on women's rights. The massive protest against the reform of the abortion law was called El tren de la libertad.

In September 2014, Prime Minister Mariano Rajoy announced that the government would abandon the draft law due to lack of consensus, and that the government would seek to reform the 2010 law only by requiring 16 and 17-year-old women to obtain parental consent for an abortion. Minister of Justice Alberto Ruiz-Gallardón announced his resignation.

== 2022 extension of rights and elimination of obstacles ==
In May 2022, the socialist government presided by Pedro Sánchez approved a bill that aims to bring voluntary termination of pregnancy to public centers, allows abortion without the need for parental consent from the age of 16, and recognizes, for the first time, the right to menstrual health. The proposal went through parliamentary procedures before entering into force. The reform came into effect in February 2023.

== Number of abortions in Spain ==
Percentage of conceptions aborted in Spain

In 2009, the number of abortions was 112,000, about 4000 less than the previous year (115,812), the first time it had decreased since 1997. According to Trinidad Jiménez, then Minister for Health and Social Policy of Spain, the decline was due to over-the-counter sales in pharmacies for the so-called morning-after pill which was liberalized in late September 2009.

In Spain, the evolution of the number of abortions, according to statistics from the Ministry of Health, is as follows:

Year	Notifiable centres of Induced abortion	Number of abortions	Rate per 1,000 women
1995		49,367	
1996		51,002	
1997		49,578	
1998	117	53,847	6.00
1999	123	58,399	6.52
2000	121	63,756	7.14
2001	121	69,857	7.66
2002	124	77,125	8.46
2003	128	79,788	8.77
2004	133	84,985	8.94
2005	134	91,664	9.60
2006	135	101,592	10.62
2007	137	112,138	11.49
2008	137	115,812	11.78
2009	141	111,482	11.41
2010	147	113,031	11.49
2011	172	118,359	12.44
2012	189	113,419	12.44
2013	198	108,690	12.12
2014	191	94,796	10.46
2015	200	94,188	10.40
2016	201	93,131	10.36
2017	212	94,123	10.51
2018	211	95,917	11.12
2019	211	99,149	11.53
2020	207	88,269	10.33
2021	207	90.189	10.7

== Surgical and medical abortions in Spain ==
Induced abortion or termination of unwanted pregnancy can be performed by two methods:

Medical abortion - Using drugs or medications such as mifepristone and misoprostol.

Surgical abortion - Clinic or hospital intervention: aspiration, dilation, and curettage.

In Europe, the use of medical abortion is generally broad, although its use varies by country. In 2010, medical abortions accounted for: 67% of induced abortions in Portugal, 49% in France, 40% in Great Britain, and 70% in Finland. In Spain, this was only 4%; in Italy, less than 4%, since the beginning of the marketing of mifepristone in December 2009.

== Other information ==
Abortion was available in a restricted form from 5 July 1985. Under this previous law, it was only allowed under the following conditions: to preserve the mental health of the mother (in which case two specialists have to approve); if the pregnancy was a byproduct of rape or incest reported to the police (the abortion must be performed in the first twelve weeks); if the fetus would have deformities or an intellectual disability upon birth (two specialists had to agree on the findings); or if the mother's physical health was in immediate danger (in which case an abortion could be performed without the consent of the woman's family physician or the woman herself).

Under the 1985 law, the threshold of "endangering the mother's mental health" was reported to be very low, making it a legitimate reason to provide elective abortion services. The legal abortion rate has more than doubled from 54,000 in 1998 to 112,000 in 2007.

In 2009, the Socialist government started to liberalize current abortion laws, sending a new law through the lower house of Parliament which would allow elective abortion care to be provided for pregnancies through the fourteenth week. The government almost succeeded in lowering the age of consent for abortions to 16, but in the end, the bill states that girls aged 16 and 17 must inform their parents (but do not need parental consent) for an abortion, except if the girl comes from an abusive household and such news will cause more strife. An estimated one million protesters turned to the streets of Madrid in protest of the proposed abortion law changes. The law won final approval on 24 February 2010, and came into force on 5 July 2010.
