= Achard–Thiers syndrome =

- Other names: Diabetic Bearded Woman Syndrome
- Specialty: Endocrinology
- Symptoms: Diabetes mellitus, deep voice, hirsutism, clitoral hypertrophy, adrenal cortical hyperplasia or adenoma amenorrhoea, hypertension and osteoporosis.
- Usual onset: Post menopausal.
- Diagnostic method: Clinical findings.
- Differential diagnosis: Acquired adrenogenital syndrome, empty sella syndrome, diabetes, and polyendocrine metabolic ovarian syndrome.
- Named after: Emile Achard; Joseph Thiers

Achard–Thiers syndrome (also known as diabetic-bearded woman syndrome) is a rare disorder mainly occurring in postmenopausal women. It is characterized by type II diabetes mellitus and signs related to the overproduction of androgens.

The disease is named for Emile Achard and Joseph Thiers.

== Presentation ==
Achard–Thiers syndrome affects mostly postmenopausal women and comprises diabetes mellitus, deep voice, hirsutism, clitoral hypertrophy and adrenal cortical hyperplasia or adenoma. Patients often also have amenorrhoea, hypertension and osteoporosis.

== Diagnosis ==
Based on the clinical findings, an Achard-Thiers syndrome diagnosis should be considered. A two-hour oral glucose tolerance test reveals abnormally elevated blood glucose levels in affected women because they are hyperinsulinemic.

== Treatment ==
Diabetes can be controlled with food, insulin, and other medications as needed. To make hair removal easier, cosmetic procedures like electrolysis and waxing can be employed. Oral contraceptive therapy is the most common treatment for younger women with polyendocrine metabolic ovarian syndrome (PMOS), while hormone replacement therapy is typically advised for postmenopausal women with Achard-Thiers syndrome. There has also been use of antiandrogens.
