= Joseph Castaigne =

Joseph Philippe Emmanuel Castaigne (French pronunciation: [ʒozɛf filip emanɥɛl kastɛɲ]; 27 February 1871 – 21 September 1951) was a French internist who was a native of Bassac, Charente.

He studied medicine in Paris, later becoming médecin des hôpitaux in 1908. During World War I, he was responsible for the treatment of wounded soldiers at a hospital in Vichy. Following the end of hostilities, he became head of medical services at the Hôpital de la Charité.

In 1920, following the death of his oldest son, he relocated to the village of Cébazat, near Clermont-Ferrand. Castaigne felt that a small village environment would be beneficial in raising his other children. At Clermont-Ferrand, he eventually attained the directorship of its medical school, working there until 1942.

At Paris, he studied under Anatole Chauffard (1855-1932) and Augustin Nicolas Gilbert (1855-1927), and performed investigations involving renal functionality with internist Emile Charles Achard (1860-1944). With Achard, the "Achard-Castaigne test" is named, a urinary test using methylene blue dye to analyze the excretory function of the kidneys. His name is also lent to the "Castaigne test", a method for examining the density of urine.

== Bibliography ==
- "Joseph Castaigne". Who Named It. Archived from the original on February 24, 2002.
