= Achard syndrome =

- Achard syndrome is inherited in an autosomal dominant manner

Achard syndrome is a syndrome consisting of arachnodactyly, receding lower jaw, and joint laxity limited to the hands and feet. Hypermobility and subluxations of the joints, increased lateral excursion of the patellas and other findings reflect the increased ligament laxity. It is clinically similar to Marfan syndrome.

== Symptoms ==
Presentation is the following:

- Small thumbs
- Joint laxity in hands
- Joint laxity in feet
- Brachycephaly
- Short mandibular rami
