= Victor Charles Hanot =

French physician

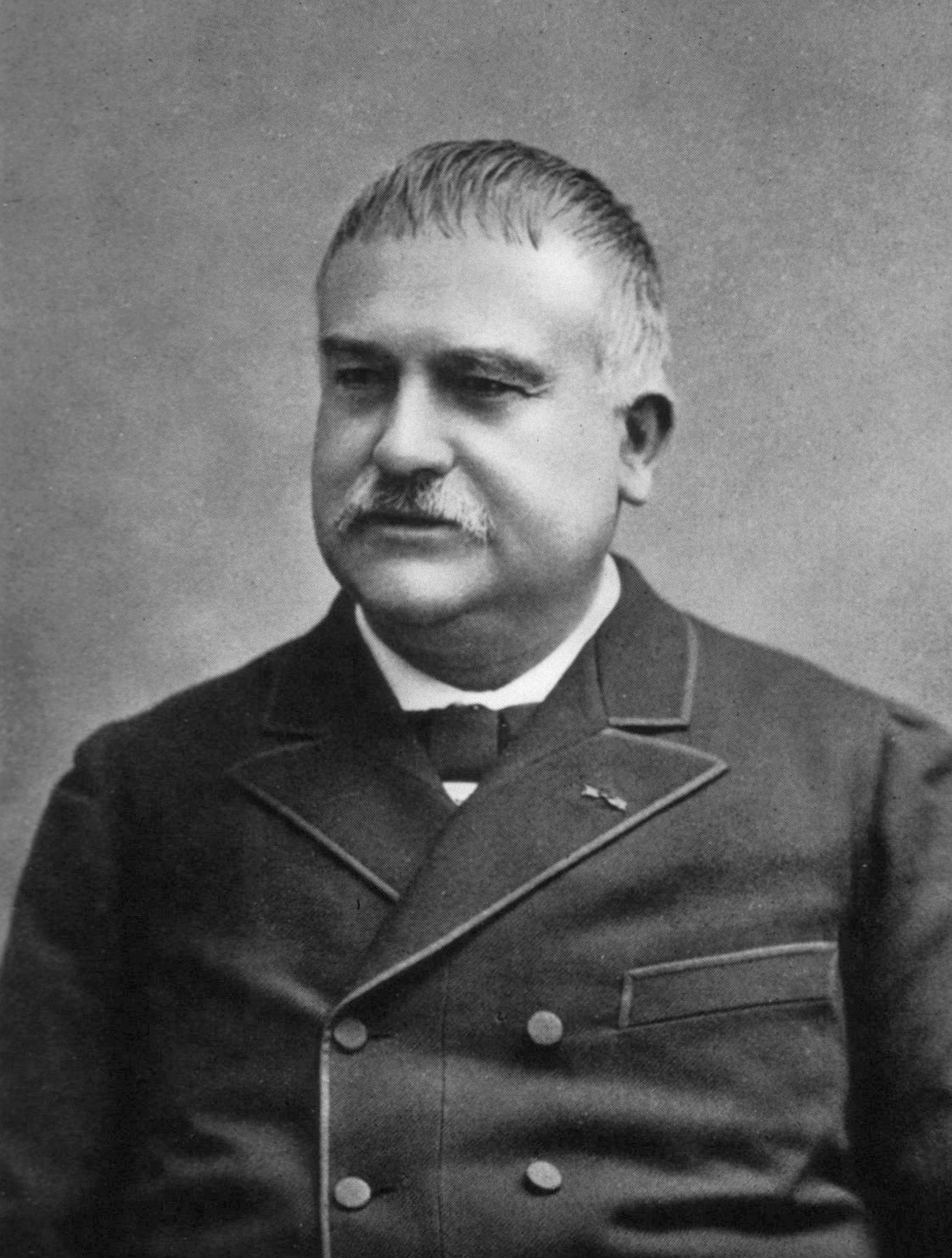
Victor Charles Hanot

Victor Charles Hanot (French pronunciation: [viktɔʁ ʃaʁl ano]; 6 July 1844 – 28 October 1896) was a French physician remembered for his work in the field of hepatology.

He earned his medical doctorate in 1875, and was associated with the Hôpital Saint-Antoine in Paris. He was professor agrégé of general medicine, and editor-in-chief of the Archives generale de médecine. Hanot was considered to be a major influence in the career of Augustin Nicolas Gilbert (1858–1927).

Hanot specialized in the study of liver diseases, making contributions in his research of cirrhosis and hemochromatosis. He provided a description of primary biliary cirrhosis, a disease sometimes referred to as "Hanot's disease". Among his written works was a study on hypertrophic cirrhosis titled Etude sur une forme de cirrhose hypertrophique du foie (cirrhose hypertrophique avec ictère chronique), (1875).

He is associated with the eponymous "Troisier-Hanot-Chauffard syndrome", characterized as hypertrophic cirrhosis with skin pigmentation and diabetes mellitus. The syndrome has several other names, such as "primary hemochromatosis", "bronze diabetes", "pigmentary cirrhosis" and "iron overload disease". It is named with two other French physicians, Charles Emile Troisier (1844–1919) and Anatole Chauffard (1855–1932).
