= Anatole Chauffard =

French internist

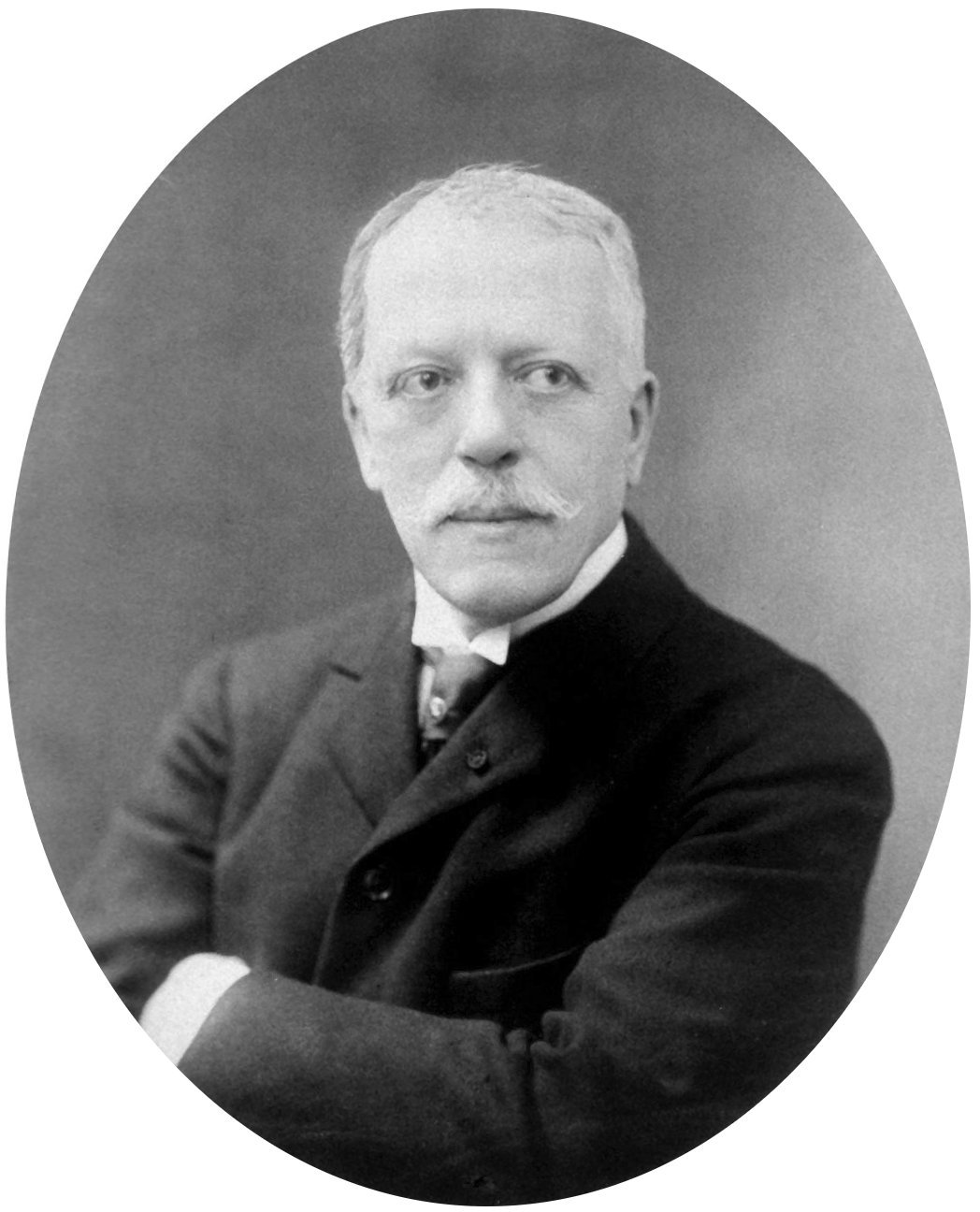
Anatole Chauffard

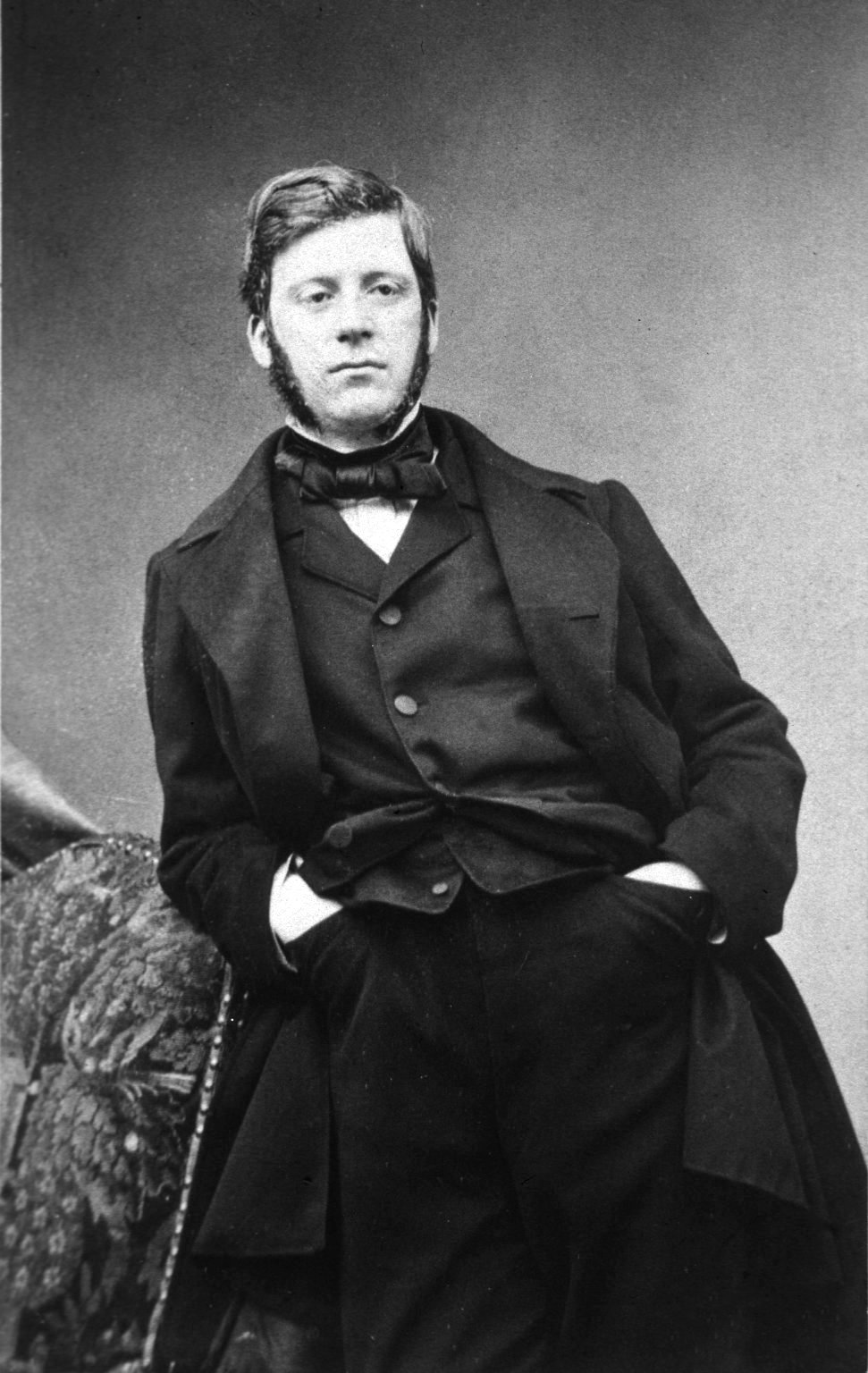
Anatole Chauffard

Anatole Marie Émile Chauffard (French pronunciation: [anatɔl maʁi emil ʃofaʁ]; 22 August 1855 – 1 November 1932) was a French internist born in Avignon.

He earned his doctorate in 1882, and became médecin des hôpitaux. In 1907 he was appointed professor of internal medicine at the Paris faculty. He was a member of the Académie de Médecine, and in 1911 attained the clinical chair at Hôpital Saint-Antoine.

Chauffard is remembered for his work involving liver disease and his pathophysiological research of hereditary spherocytosis. His name is associated with the following disorders:

- "Minkowski-Chauffard disease": Congenital hemolytic anemia with spherocytosis, splenomegaly and jaundice. Named with Oskar Minkowski (1858–1931).
- "Troisier-Hanot-Chauffard syndrome": Hypertrophic cirrhosis with skin pigmentation and diabetes mellitus. Sometimes called primary hemochromatosis, bronze diabetes, pigmentary cirrhosis or iron overload disease. Named with Victor Charles Hanot (1844–1896) and Charles Emile Troisier (1844–1919).

== Writings ==
- Cirrhose hypertrophique pigmentaire dans le diabète sucré. Revue de médecine, Paris, 1882, 2: 385–403. (with Victor Charles Hanot)
- Xanthélasma disséminé et symétrique, sans insuffisance hépatique. Bulletins et memoires de la Société medicale des hôpitaux de Paris, 1889, 3 sér., 6: 412–419.
- Des adénopathies dans le rhumatisme chronique infectieux. Revue de médecine, Paris, 1896; 16: 345. (with F. Ramon)
- Pathogénie de l’ictère congénital de l’adulte. La semaine médicale, Paris, 1907, 27: 25–29.
- Les ictères hémolytiques. La semaine médicale, Paris, 1908, 28: 45 and 49.
- Pathogénie de l’ictere hémolytique congénital. Annales de médecine interne, Paris, 1914: 1-17.

== Bibliography ==
- "Anatole Chauffard". Who Named It. Archived from the original on April 27, 2002.
