= Hepatology =

Medical specialty

Hepatologist
Occupation
- Names: Doctor, Medical Specialist
- Occupation type: Specialty
- Activity sectors: Medicine

Description
- Education required: General medical education: Doctor of Medicine (M.D.); Doctor of Osteopathic Medicine (D.O.); Bachelor of Medicine, Bachelor of Surgery (M.B.B.S.); Specialization: Internal medicine specialiazation; Gastroenterology subspecialization; Extra training as a gastroenterologist in hepatology and transplant hepatology
- Fields of employment: Hospitals, clinics

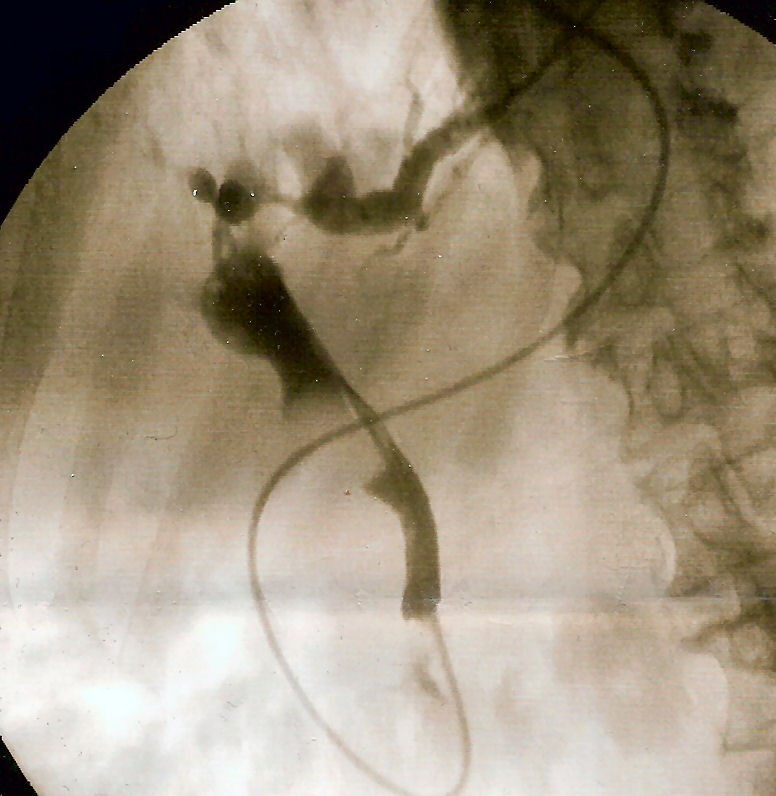
Fluoroscopic image of common bile duct

Hepatology is the branch of medicine that incorporates the study of liver, gallbladder, biliary tree, and pancreas as well as management of their disorders. Although traditionally considered a sub-specialty of gastroenterology, rapid expansion has led in some countries to hepatologists, physicians who specialize solely on this area.

Diseases and complications related to viral hepatitis and alcohol are the main reason for seeking specialist advice. More than two billion people have been infected with hepatitis B virus at some point in their life, and approximately 350 million have become persistent carriers. Up to 80% of liver cancers can be attributed to either hepatitis B or hepatitis C virus. In terms of mortality, the former is second only to smoking among known agents causing cancer. With more widespread implementation of vaccination and strict screening before blood transfusion, lower infection rates are expected in the future. In many countries, however, overall alcohol consumption is increasing, and consequently the number of people with cirrhosis and other related complications is commensurately increasing.

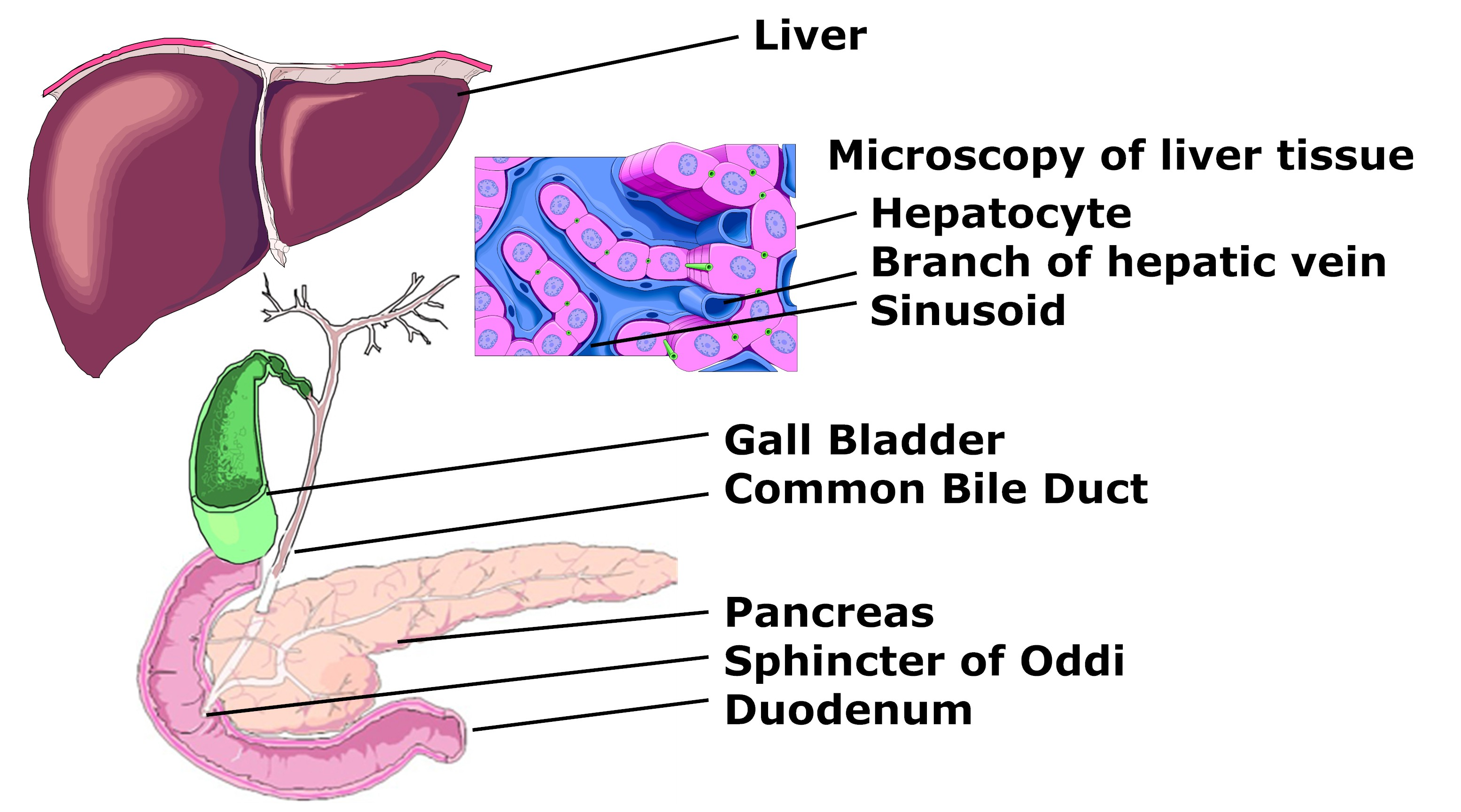
Schematic diagram of hepato-biliary system

== Scope of specialty ==
As for many medical specialties, patients are most likely to be referred by family physicians (also known as general practitioners or GPs) or by physicians from different disciplines. The reasons might be:

- Drug overdose. Paracetamol overdose is common.
- Gastrointestinal bleeding from portal hypertension related to liver damage
- Abnormal blood test suggesting liver disease
- Enzyme defects leading to bigger liver in children commonly named storage disease of liver
- Jaundice / Hepatitis virus positivity in blood, perhaps discovered on screening blood tests
- Ascites or swelling of abdomen from fluid accumulation, commonly due to liver disease but can be from other diseases like heart failure
- All patients with advanced liver disease such as cirrhosis should be under specialist care
- To undergo endoscopic retrograde cholangiopancreatography (ERCP) for diagnosing diseases of biliary tree or their management
- Fever with other features suggestive of infection involving mentioned organs. Some exotic tropical diseases like hydatid cyst, kala-azar or schistosomiasis may be suspected. Microbiologists would be involved as well
- Systemic diseases affecting liver and biliary tree such as haemochromatosis
- Follow-up of liver transplant
- Pancreatitis – commonly due to alcohol or gallstone
- Cancer of above organs. Usually multi-disciplinary approach is undertaken with involvement of oncologist and other experts.

== History ==
Dr. B Blumberg, awarded Nobel prize 1976 for discovery of hepatitis B virus

Evidence from autopsies on Egyptian mummies suggests that liver damage from the parasitic infection bilharziasis was widespread in the ancient society. It is possible that the Greeks may have been aware of the liver's ability to exponentially duplicate as illustrated by the story of Prometheus. However, knowledge about liver disease in antiquity is questionable. Most of the important advances in the field have been made in the last 50 years.

- In 400 BC Hippocrates mentioned liver abscess in aphorisms.
- Roman anatomist Galen thought the liver was the principal organ of the body. He also identified its relationship with the gallbladder and spleen.
- Around 100 CE Aretaeus of Cappadocia wrote on jaundice
- In the medieval period Avicenna noted the importance of urine in diagnosing liver conditions.
- In 1770, French anatomist Antoine Portal noted bleeding due to oesophageal varices,
- In 1844, Gabriel Valentin showed pancreatic juices break down food in digestion.
- 1846 Justus Von Leibig discovered pancreatic juice tyrosine
- 1862 Austin Flint described the production of "stercorin".
- 1875 Victor Charles Hanot described cirrhotic jaundice and other diseases of the liver
- In 1958, Moore developed a standard technique for canine orthotopic liver transplantation.
- The first human liver transplant was performed in 1963 by Dr. Thomas E. Starzl on a three-year-old male afflicted with biliary atresia after perfecting the technique on canine livers.
- Baruch S. Blumberg discovered hepatitis B virus in 1966 and developed the first vaccine against it 1969. He was awarded the Nobel Prize in Physiology or Medicine 1976.
- In 1989, investigators from the CDC (Daniel W. Bradley) and Chiron (Michael Houghton) identified the hepatitis C virus, which had previously been known as non-A, non-B hepatitis and could not be detected in the blood supply.
- Only in 1992 was a blood test created that could detect hepatitis C in donated blood.

The word hepatology is from Ancient Greek ἧπαρ (hepar) or ἡπατο- (hepato-), meaning "liver", and -λογία (-logia), meaning "study".

== Disease classification ==
1. International Classification of Disease (ICD 2007) – WHO classification:
  - Chapter XI: Diseases of the digestive system
    - K70-K77 Diseases of liver
    - K80-K87 Disorders of gallbladder, biliary tract and pancreas
2. MeSH (medical subject heading):sam
  - G02.403.776.409.405 same as "Gastroenterology"
  - C06.552 Liver Diseases
  - C06.130 Biliary Tract Diseases
  - C06.689 Pancreatic diseases
3. National Library of Medicine Catalogue
  - WI 700–740 Liver and biliary tree Diseases
  - WI 800–830 Pancrease

== Important procedures ==
- Endoscopic retrograde cholangiopancreatography (ERCP)
- Transhepatic pancreato-cholangiography (TPC)
- Transjugular intrahepatic portosystemic shunt (TIPSS)
- Liver transplant and pancreas transplant

== See also ==
- Journal of Clinical and Translational Hepatology
