= Chongqing Medical University =

Medical university in Chongqing, China

Coordinates: 29.5358°N 106.5050°E

- 重庆医科大学
- Type: Public university
- Established: 1956
- Students: 25,857
- Location: Chongqing, China
- Campus: Yuzhong District Shapingba District
- Website: cqmu.edu.cn

Chongqing Medical University (CQMU; Chinese: 重庆医科大学), previously referred to as the Chongqing University of Medical Sciences (CQUMS), was established in 1956 in Chongqing, China. It was originally a branch of the Shanghai First Medical College (now named the Shanghai Medical College of Fudan University).

== Overview ==
CQMU is a state key university under the administration of the Chongqing Municipal Government with an integrated educational system of baccalaureate, masters, doctoral, and postdoctoral programs in medicine as well as other health-related fields.

It is one of approximately 30 medical universities in China that are approved by the Chinese Ministry of Education to enroll foreign students into the English-medium MBBS (Bachelor of Medicine and Bachelor of Surgery) program. It is recognized by the World Health Organization (WHO) and the ECFMG (Educational Committee for Foreign Medical Graduates) in the United States.

== Organization and affiliations ==
Chongqing Medical University currently has 15 affiliated hospitals under its administration. Together, these hospitals provide more than 20,800 beds, accommodate approximately 15.46 million outpatient visits, and manage nearly 660,000 inpatient discharges annually.

Chongqing Medical University comprises 22 schools and departments, offering 36 undergraduate programs. It has been designated with 19 national-level first-class undergraduate program development sites and 28 first-class sites at the Chongqing municipal level. Academic programs such as clinical medicine, stomatology, nursing, traditional Chinese medicine, pediatrics, psychiatry, anesthesiology, medical imaging, pharmacy, and clinical pharmacy have received accreditation from the Ministry of Education.

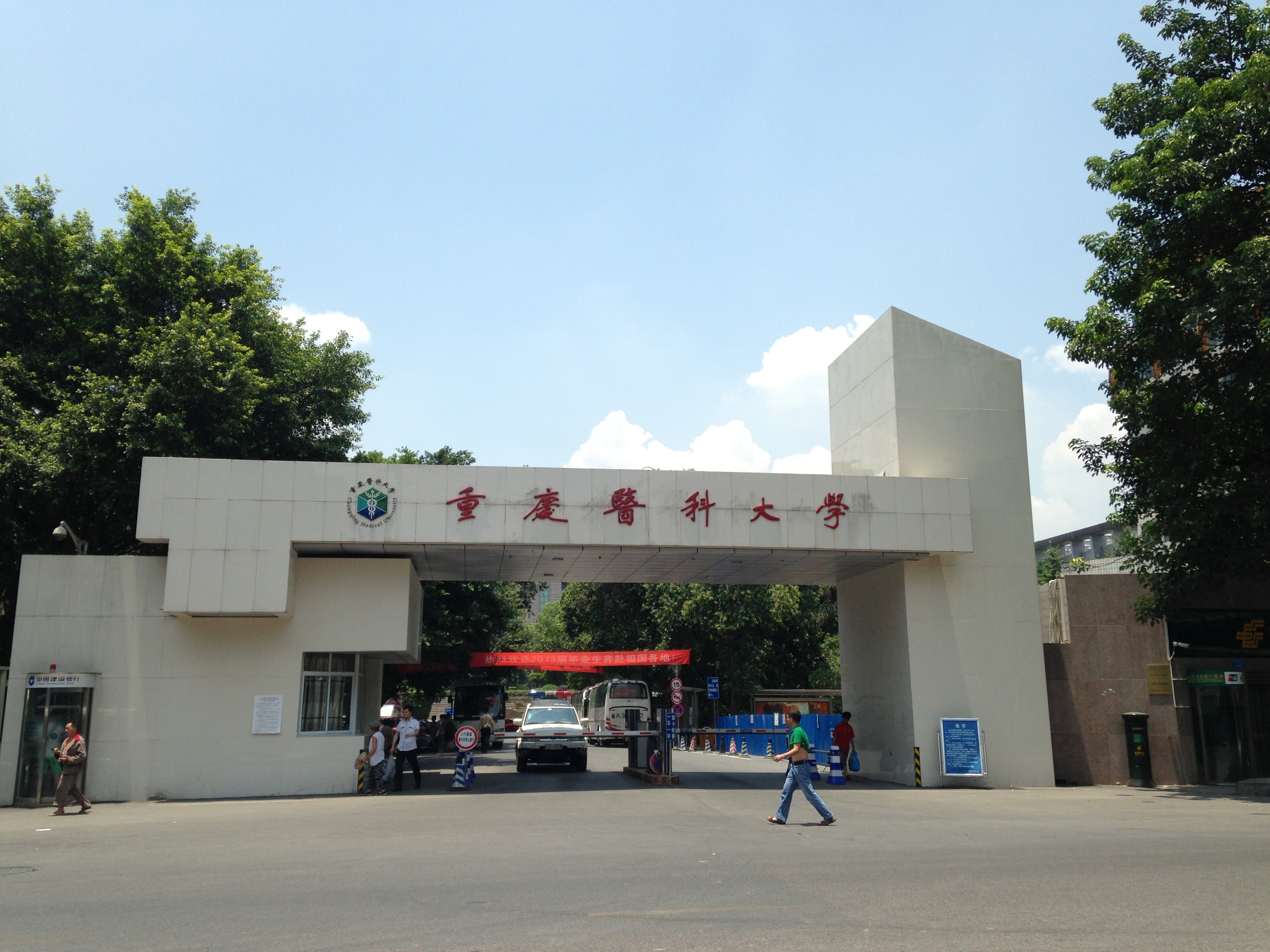
Chongqing Medical University

On the research front, CQMU has three state key laboratories under the Ministry of Education, one state key laboratory under the Chongqing Ministry of Science and Technology, one national engineering research center, 18 municipal key laboratories, 11 research institutes, six research centers, and 22 research laboratories. Since 2020, the university has added more than 4,500 new research projects funded at various levels by the Ministry of Science and Technology and the National Natural Science Foundation of China (NSFC), taken the lead in 54 national key projects, and published over 10,000 SCI-indexed papers, with an average annual growth rate of 10%. It has also received 38 new scientific and technological awards at the provincial and ministerial levels.

== Faculty and Student ==
Chongqing Medical University currently has 2,497 full-time faculty members, including 1,690 professionals holding senior academic titles. Among the faculty are 432 doctoral supervisors and 1,598 master's supervisors.

CQMU has a total enrollment of 27,724 full-time students, including 1,601 doctoral candidates, 7,249 master's students, 18,044 undergraduates, and 331 junior college students enrolled under minority support programs. The university also hosts 499 international students.

== Academic programs and research ==
CQMU offers five postdoctoral programs, 26 doctoral programs, 53 masters programs, and 46 specialities for undergraduates. It has four state key disciplines and 43 municipal key disciplines.

CQMU has accomplished several large-scale research projects including some state-level projects supported by the National Key Technology Research and Development Program in the 6th to 9th Five-year Plan for National Economic and Social Development, Key Program of National Natural Science Foundation, National Basic Research Program (known as '973 Program'), and the National Hi-Tech Research and Development Program (known as '863 Program').

The High-intensity Focused Ultrasonic Therapy System (HIFU), which was initiated by CQMU, is the first large-scale medical equipment system with completely independent intellectual property rights in China. It has been put into use in over 30 major hospitals in China and exported to about ten foreign countries, such as the EU, Russia, Japan, Korea, and Singapore.

The university publishes eight academic journals with international distribution.

Since 2008, CQMU has twice won the National Prize for Progress in Science and Technology, once won the National Award for Technological Invention once, and won over 80 municipal awards. There are many international students from India, Indonesia, Republic of the Congo, Mauritius, Vietnam, Pakistan, Nepal, Bangladesh, etc.
