= Marie Wittman =

French hysteria patient (1859–1913)

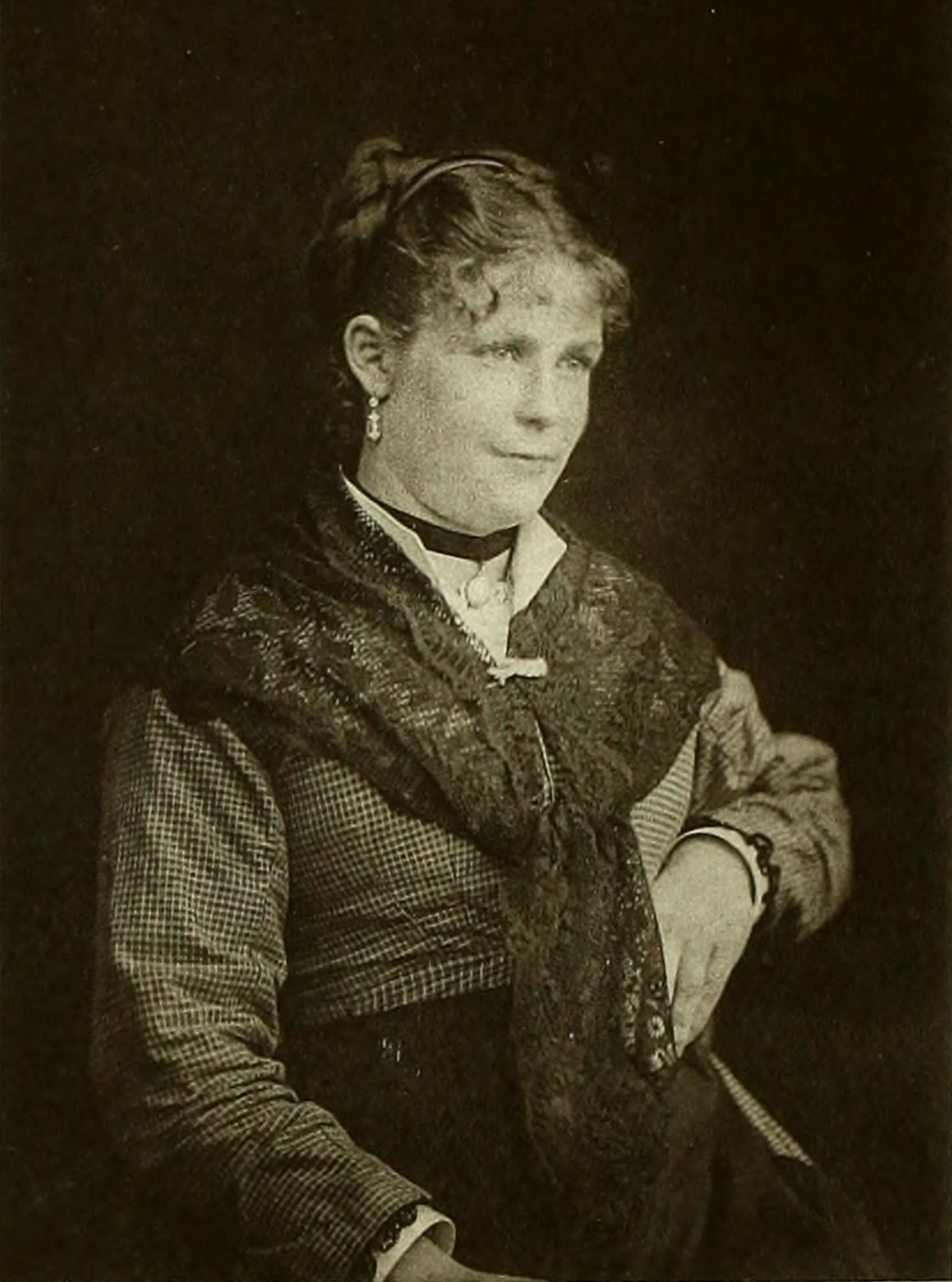
- Wittman around 1880
- Born: April 15, 1859; Paris, Second French Empire
- Died: 1913 (aged 54)
- Known for: Hysteria patient of Jean-Martin Charcot

Marie "Blanche" Wittman (often spelled Wittmann; French pronunciation: [maʁi vitman]; April 15, 1859 – 1913) was a French woman known as one of the hysteria patients of Jean-Martin Charcot. She was institutionalized in La Salpêtrière in 1877, and was treated by Charcot until his death in 1893. She later became a radiology assistant at the hospital, which resulted in amputations of her arms due to radiation poisoning.

Charcot's techniques were controversial; commentators have disagreed as to whether Wittman suffered from a physical condition like epileptic seizures, suffered from mass hysteria resulting from conditions at La Salpêtrière, or was merely feigning symptoms. She is depicted in A Clinical Lesson at the Salpêtrière (1887) and was the subject of a 2004 Per Olov Enquist novel.

== Early life ==
Wittman was born in Paris on April 15, 1859. Her early life is known only from information she provided to Paul-Marie-Léon Regnard and Désiré-Magloire Bourneville in 1877. Wittman's father was a Swiss carpenter; prone to anger, he went insane and was placed in an institution. Her mother was a linen maid. Five of Wittman's eight siblings died of epilepsy and seizures. At 22 months old, she became deaf and mute after suffering seizures, but she regained her speech and hearing around age seven. She scarcely attended school because of difficulty learning and could barely read and write. She was prone to fits of anger, to which her mother responded by throwing water on her.

At age 12, she was apprenticed to a furrier. Her attacks worsened, with Wittman losing consciousness and urinating on herself. However, they were usually at night, so she kept them hidden. When she was 13, the furrier would kiss her whenever they were alone, and attempted to rape her. Her attacks became more frequent, and she began to have tremors, later saying that "Everything I held in my hands escaped me". The furrier assumed that her clumsiness was intentional; she ran away after he attempted to beat her.

Wittman stayed with her mother and worked in a laundry from age 14 to 15; during that time she had "relations" with a jeweler named Louis. Her mother died when Wittman was 15; she returned to work for the furrier. The two regularly had sex; after eight months she fled to a friend of her mother. Eight days later she entered a hospital as a duty maid, where she began a relationship with a young man named Alphonse. He would compress her right ovarian region when she had attacks. After a few months, they spent a week in the countryside; upon her return to Paris, she sought asylum in a convent on the Rue du Cherche-Midi.

Though her attacks happened largely at night, Wittman was dismissed from the convent after tearing a garment during a daytime attack. She would often see Louis during her attacks. She found work as a servant at La Salpêtrière, intending to be admitted into the hospital. Wittman was admitted as a patient in an epilepsy ward on May 6, 1877, at the age of 18.

== Treatment by Charcot ==
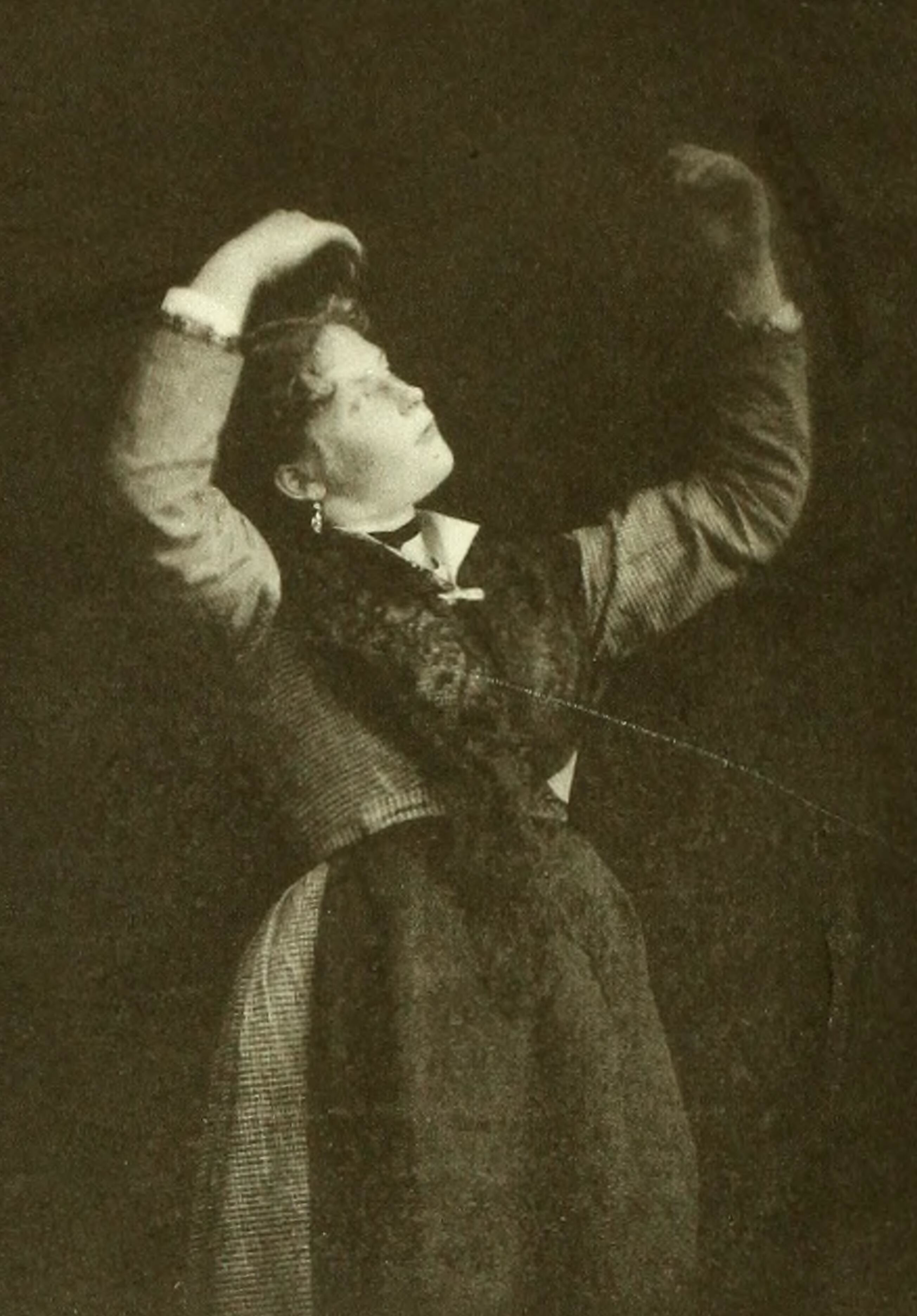
Wittman photographed in a cataleptic pose around 1880

Upon admission, Wittman was found to have partial numbness on her right side and loss of sensitivity in her left arm, as well as ovarian sensitivity before 'attacks'. She collected objects including artificial roses and religious items, and wore a scapular. She was of average intelligence; her memory was good, though she believed it had declined over the previous year due to her frequent use of ether. She was soon treated by Jean-Martin Charcot, who believed she had hysteria. Her attacks began seven days after admission and would last for up to several hours, during which she would make rapid motions, become rigid, and act out sexual scenes. They followed three stages – epileptoid, generalized clonic period, and delirium – that Charcot identified. She would experience generalized stiffness with limb extension, finger flexion and tetanic contractions, downward deviation of the eyes, and foaming at the mouth during the epileptoid stage. This was followed by vertical and rhythmic movement of the head that would strike the pillow for a few seconds in the clonic period. She would mumble in a state of delirium, frequently uttering "Blanche" (the name of one of her sisters); this resulted in "Blanche" becoming her nickname.

In 1878, Charcot began treating patients including Wittman with hypnosis. She was also treated with ether, chloroform, and amyl nitrite with some success, though she soon showed tolerance with ether. Static electricity from a Ramsden machine was used in 1879 to restore feeling to the right side of her body. She was also a subject for faradisation experiments where electricity was used to induce muscular movements, often for photography.

Charcot gave weekly lectures and demonstrations with patients, including Wittman. They were frequently attended by dancers, actresses (including Sarah Bernhardt), and other performers wishing to see the wide range of emotions that Wittman displayed during her attacks. Though popular, they were criticized for their circus-like showmanship and sexual innuendo; under hypnosis, Wittman was made to act out theatrics with comedic effect. Charcot was also plagued with reports that some patients feigned symptoms for attention and fame. These claims were made in 1890 by intern Alfred Binet; after Charcot's 1893 death, his assistant Joseph Babinski rejected Charcot's neurological explanation of hysteria. Wittman reportedly never had any attacks after Charcot's death. However, she claimed in a 1906 interview that her symptoms were real, and that it was not possible to fool Charcot with such acting.

In The Discovery of the Unconscious (1970), Henri Ellenberger claims that Wittman was also treated by Jules Janet at the Hôtel-Dieu, where an alternate personality emerged under hypnosis. Ellenberger claims that Janet kept Wittman in this "Blanche II" state for several months, and that "Blanche II" was conscious even while "Blanche I" was unconscious during Charcot's demonstrations. However, this claim was not discussed in the 1906 interview.

A 2017 study of Wittman's symptoms concluded that she likely suffered from psychogenic non-epileptic seizures, though some elements like reported ovarian hypersensitivity may have been related to mass hysteria resulting from conditions at La Salpêtrière were also possible.

== Later life ==
Wittman returned to La Salpêtrière on October 11, 1889, as an assistant to photographer Albert Londe, who had previously photographed Wittman and the other patients. Londe was appointed head of the radiology department the next year. The health effects of radiation were not yet understood; both of Wittman's arms were eventually amputated due to radiation-induced cancer. Wittman died in 1913 at the age of 54. (Note: Some sources list her death as being of a hemorrhage in August 1909 "at the age of 56" (inconsistent with her 1859 birth) or 1912.)

== Depictions ==
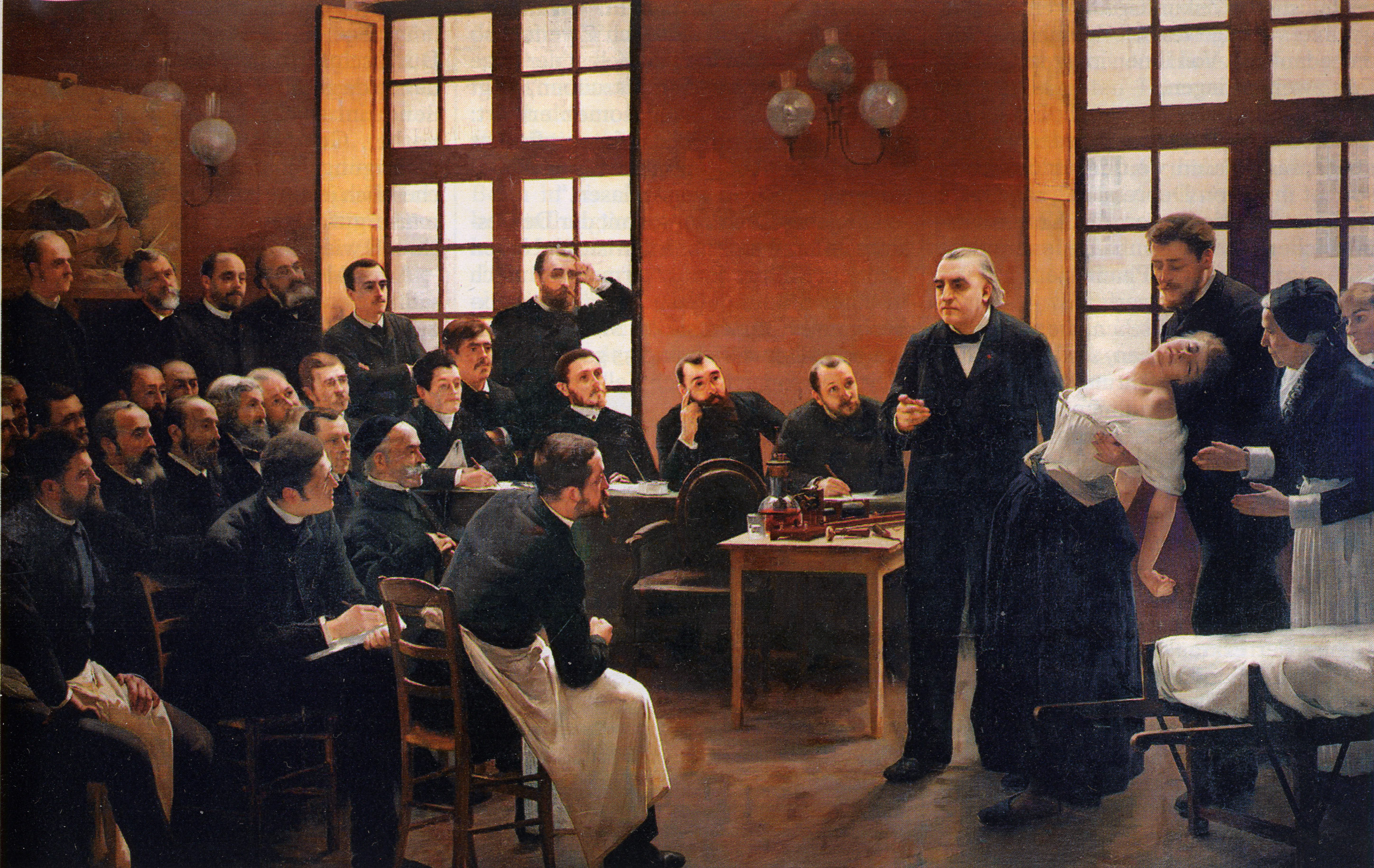
Wittman (in white) depicted in A Clinical Lesson at the Salpêtrière

Wittman is depicted in André Brouillet's 1887 painting A Clinical Lesson at the Salpêtrière, where she is used in a demonstration during one of Charcot's weekly lectures. This depiction made her "a model of hysteria at that time". The painting is usually interpreted as showing Wittman undergoing a hysteric fit while under hypnosis. However, a 2020 paper argues that the apparatus visible next to Charcot is a du Bois-Reymond induction device, and that the painting thus depicts Wittman in hypnotic lethargy, with Charcot having electrically induced the "ecstatic" expression on her face.

Per Olov Enquist's 2004 novel Boken om Blanche och Marie (The book about Blanche and Marie) takes the form of purported lost journals by Wittman. The novel takes considerable historical liberties: Wittman is portrayed in a sexual relationship with Charcot, and later becomes Marie Curie's assistant and confidante. The novel was well received; its use of Curie's investigations of radiation as a metaphor for human experience was praised. However, a 2007 letter published in The Lancet criticized the novel for the "slandering of an unfortunate patient and two icons of science", including the invention of the relationship between Charcot and Wittman.

== See also ==
- Louise Augustine Gleizes
