= Charles Féré =

French physician (1852–1907)

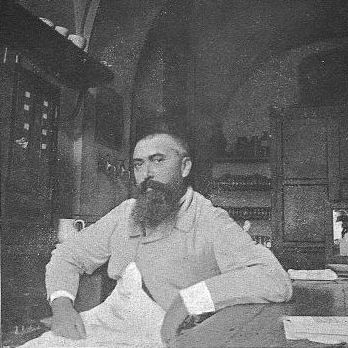
Charles Féré (1852-1907)

Charles Samson Féré (13 July 1852 in Auffay – 22 April 1907) was a French physician.

He initially studied medicine in Rouen, where he subsequently served at the Hôtel-Dieu under surgeon Achille Flaubert (1813-1882), an older brother of writer Gustave Flaubert (1821-1880). Afterwards, he relocated to Paris, where in 1877 he gained his internship. In 1881 he began work as an assistant to Jean-Martin Charcot (1825-1893), who was a profound influence to Féré's career. In 1887, he was appointed chief medical officer at the Hospice Bicêtre, remaining there for the rest of his career.

Féré's wide-ranging research covered subjects such as medicine, psychology, criminology, sexuality, hypnosis, Darwinism, heredity, et al. The following are a few of his principal written works:

- Le Magnétisme animal (with Alfred Binet), 1887 - Animal magnetism.
- Dégénérescence et criminalité, 1888 - Degeneration and criminality.
- La Pathologie des émotions, 1892 - The pathology of emotions.
- La Famille névropathique, 1894 - The neuropathic family.
- L'instinct sexuel: évolution et dissolution, 1899 - The sexual instinct, evolution and dissolution.

Féré is credited with introducing the term "hallucination altruiste" to denote a hallucination depicting a person to whom a sensation, wish, or feeling is conveyed or attributed.

== See also ==
- A Clinical Lesson at the Salpêtrière – 1887 painting by André Brouillet
