= Sarko (disambiguation) =

Sarko usually refers to Nicolas Sarkozy, President of France 2007–2012.

Sarko may also refer to:

- Anita Sarko (1947–2015), DJ from Detroit
- Šarko shower, a massaging shower for medical purposes
- Sarko, a fictional character of DC Comics' Green Lantern Corps
- Šarko (Šarplaninac), dog breed
