= Albert Londe =

French photographer and medical researcher

- Born: 26 November 1858; La Ciotat, France
- Died: 11 September 1917 (aged 58); Reuil-en-Brie, France
- Occupations: Photographer, medical researcher
- Known for: Chronophotography, Medical photography

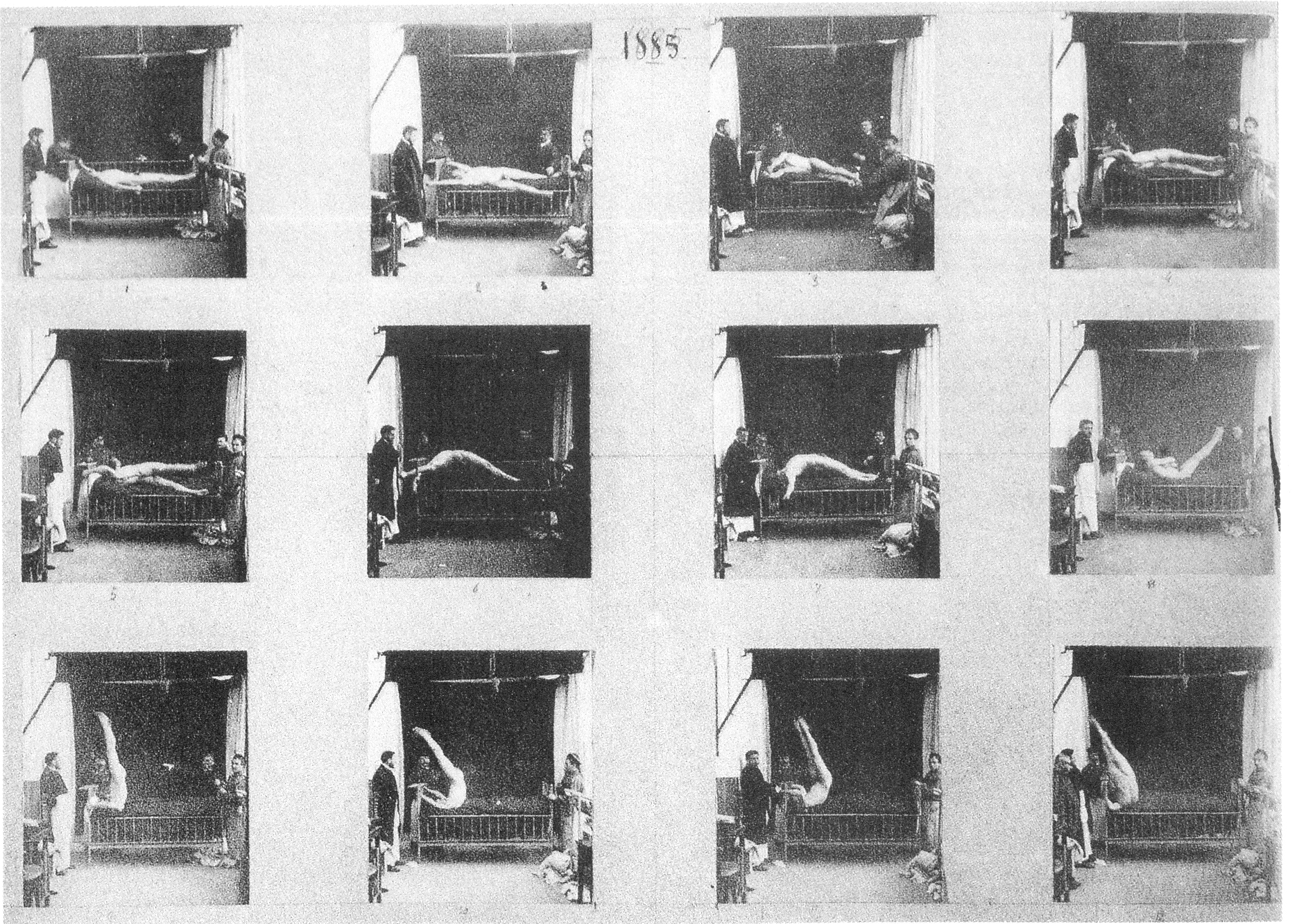
Chronophotographic image by Londe of what was described as an attack of hysteria.

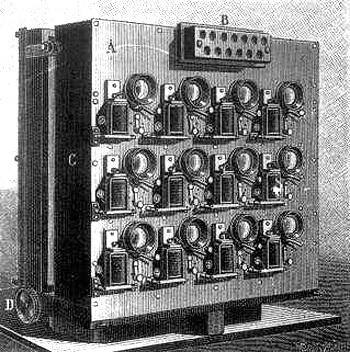
Albert Londe's twelve lens camera (1893), illustrated by Étienne-Jules Marey.

Albert Londe (26 November 1858 – 11 September 1917) was a French photographer, medical researcher and chronophotographer. He is remembered for his work as a medical photographer at the Salpêtrière Hospital in Paris, funded by the Parisian authorities, as well as being a pioneer in X-ray photography.

== Career at Salpêtrière ==
In 1878, the neurologist Jean-Martin Charcot hired Londe as a medical photographer at the Salpêtrière Hospital. Londe spent two decades at the institution, becoming a significant figure in scientific photography of the era.

Working alongside Étienne-Jules Marey (1830–1904), Londe performed many photographic experiments regarding movement. The layout of his laboratory at the Salpêtrière was modeled on Marey's renowned Station Physiologique.

== Chronophotography and inventions ==
In 1882, Londe devised a system to photograph the physical and muscular movements of patients, including individuals experiencing epileptic seizures. He accomplished this by using a camera with nine lenses triggering by electromagnetic energy. Using a metronome to time the release of the shutters sequentially, he was able to take photos onto glass plates in quick succession.

A few years later, Londe developed a camera with twelve lenses to further study movement. The sequence of twelve pictures could be captured over durations ranging from 1/10 of a second to several seconds.

Londe's cameras were used for medical studies of muscle movement in subjects performing actions as diverse as tightrope-walking and blacksmithing. Although the apparatus was primarily designed for medical research, Londe noted its portability and utilized it for other subjects, such as horses, other animals, and ocean waves.

In conjunction with General Sobert, Londe developed a chronophotographic device used to study ballistics. Londe's images served as illustrations in several books widely read by the medical and artistic communities, most notably those by Paul Richer.

== Selected publications ==
Londe published several journals and books regarding his practice.

- Anatomie pathologique de la moelle epiniere (1891) (with Paul Oscar Blocq)
- La photographie médicale: Application aux sciences médicales et physiologiques (1893) – The first book on medical photography.
- Traité pratique de radiographie et de radioscope: technique et applications médicales (1898)

== See also ==
- History of photography
- A Clinical Lesson at the Salpêtrière – 1887 group tableau portrait by André Brouillet
