= Alfred Joseph Naquet =

French chemist and politician

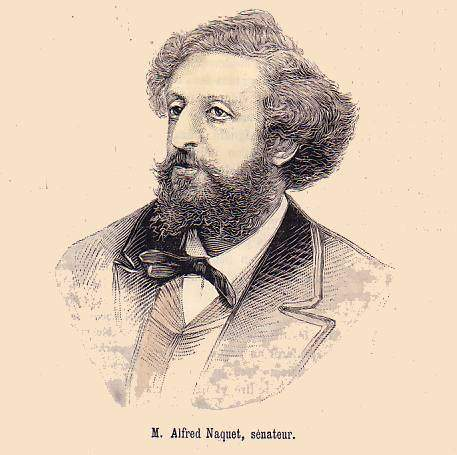
Alfred Naquet

Alfred Joseph Naquet (6 October 1834 – 10 November 1916), was a French chemist and politician.

== Biography ==
Naquet was born at Carpentras (Vaucluse), on 6 October 1834. He became professor in the faculty of medicine in Paris in 1863, and in the same year professor of chemistry at Palermo, where he delivered his lectures in Italian. He lost his professorship in 1867 along with his civic rights when he was condemned to fifteen months' imprisonment for his share in a secret society. On a new prosecution in 1869 for his book Religion, propriété, famille he took refuge in Spain. Returning to France under the government of Émile Ollivier he took an active share in the revolution of 4 September 1870 and became secretary of the commission of national defence.

In the French National Assembly he sat on the extreme Left, consistently opposing the opportunist policy of successive governments. Re-elected to the Chamber of Deputies of France he began the agitation against the marriage laws with which his name is especially connected. His proposal for the re-establishment of divorce was discussed in May 1879 and again in 1881 and 1882, becoming law two years later. Naquet, although he disapproved in principle of a second chamber, secured his election to the Senate of France in 1883 to pilot his measure through that body. In 1884 by his efforts divorce became legal after three years of definite separation on the demand of one of the parties concerned. In 1890 he resigned from the senate to re-enter the Chamber of Deputies, this time for the 5th arrondissement of Paris, and took his seat with the Boulangist deputies. After Boulanger's suicide his political influence declined, and was further compromised by accusations (of which he was legally cleared) in connection with the Panama scandals. Naquet died in Paris on 10 November 1916.

== Works ==
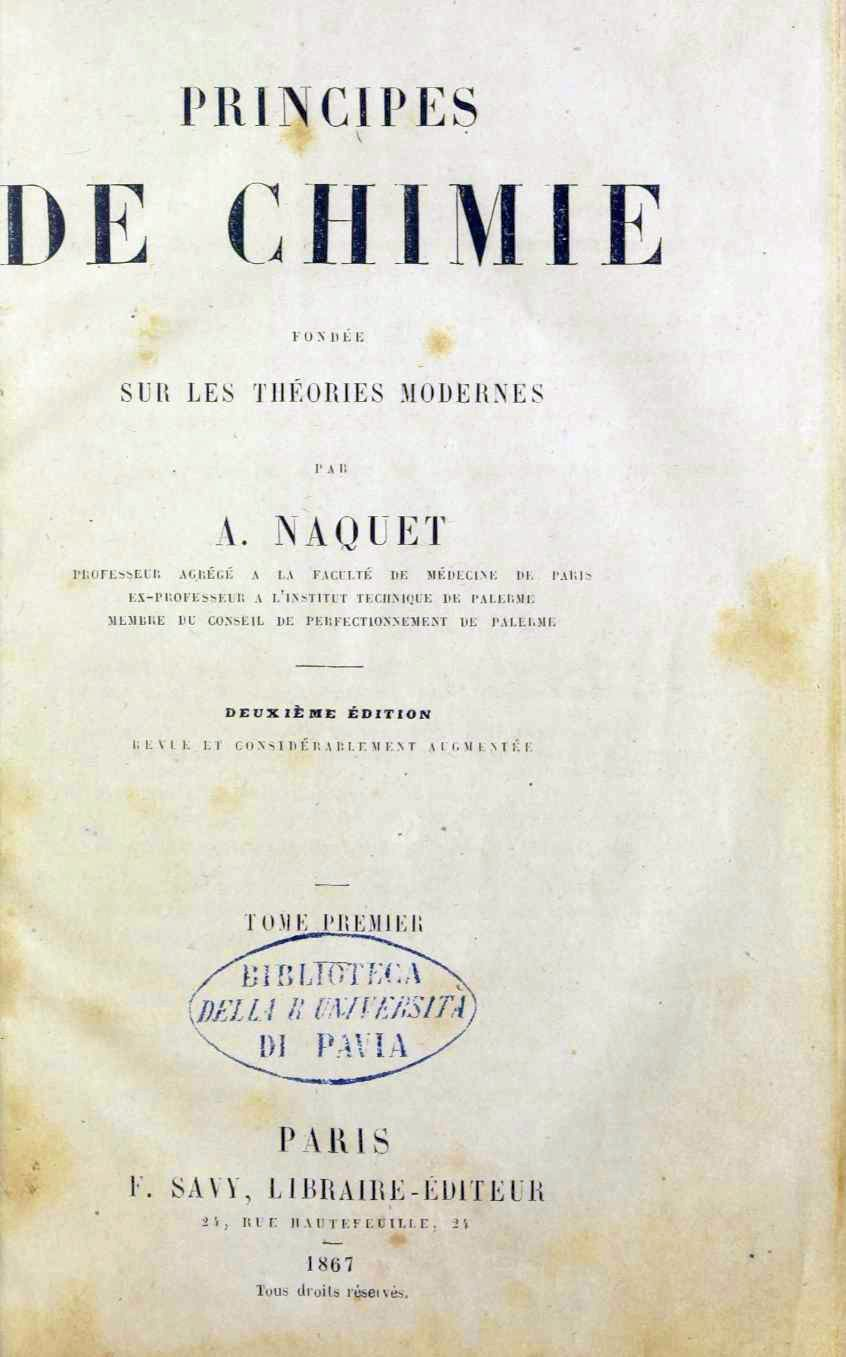
Principes de chimie fondée sur les théories modernes, 1867

The thesis written for his doctorate, Application de l'analyse chimique à la toxicologie (1859), was followed by many papers on chemistry contributed to learned journals, and his Principes de chimie fondés sur les théories modernes (1865) reached its 5th edition in 1890. He is better known by his political works, Socialisme collectiviste et socialisme libéral (1890, Eng. trans., 1891), Temps Futurs: Socialisme-Anarchie (1900), L'Humanité et la patrie (1901), La Loi du divorce (1903), L'Anarchie et le collectivisme (1904), and Désarmement ou alliance anglaise (1908).

=== List of works ===
- Principes de chimie fondée sur les théories modernes (in French). Vol. 1. Paris: Savy. 1867.
  - Principes de chimie fondée sur les théories modernes (in French). Vol. 2. Paris: Savy. 1867.

== See also ==
- A Clinical Lesson at the Salpêtrière – 1887 group tableau portrait by André Brouillet
