= Albert Gombault =

French neurologist (1844–1904)

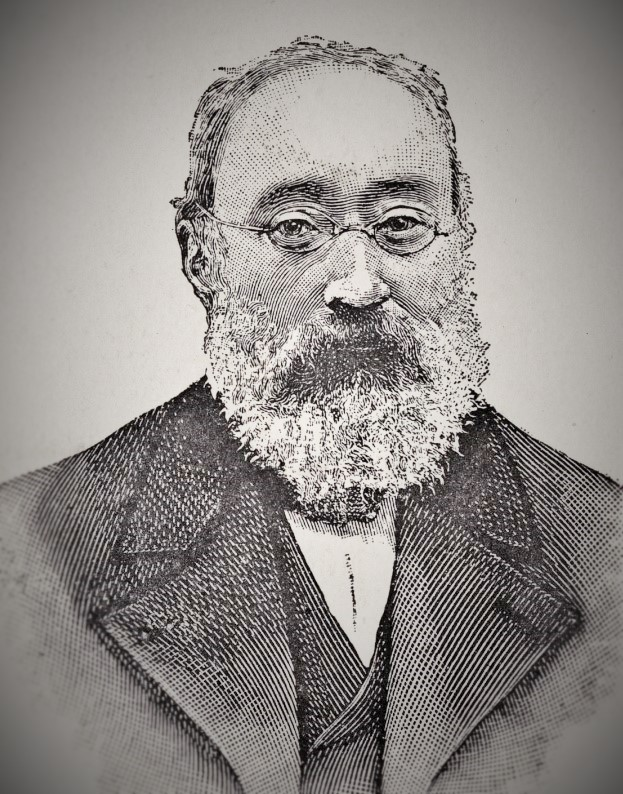
Albert Gombault (wood engraving from the Collection BIU Santé Médecine)

François Alexis Albert Gombault (3 October 1844 – 23 September 1904) was a French neurologist who was a native of Orléans.

He studied medicine in Paris, where he was a student and collaborator of Jean-Martin Charcot (1825–1893). From 1887, he was associated with the Hospice d'Ivry, and for years served as chef de travaux in the pathological anatomy laboratory of Victor André Cornil (1837–1908).

In 1880, Gombault published an early description involving a type of hypertrophic neuritis that was later known as Dejerine–Sottas syndrome. With Charcot, he performed important research of obstructive biliary cirrhosis. In 1877, he published Etude sur la sclérose latérale amyotrophique, a study on "Charcot disease", better known as amyotrophic lateral sclerosis (ALS).

== Eponyms associated with Gombault ==
- Charcot–Gombault necrosis: a biliary infarct, which is a late-stage complication of extra-hepatic cholestasis. (Eponym known from historical literature).
- Gombault–Philippe triangle: a triangular field formed in the conus medullaris by the fibers of the septomarginal tract. Named with pathologist Claudien Philippe (1866–1903).

== See also ==
- A Clinical Lesson at the Salpêtrière – 1887 group tableau portrait by André Brouillet
