= Iradj Gandjbaksh =

Iranian physician and surgeon

Iradj Gandjbakhch
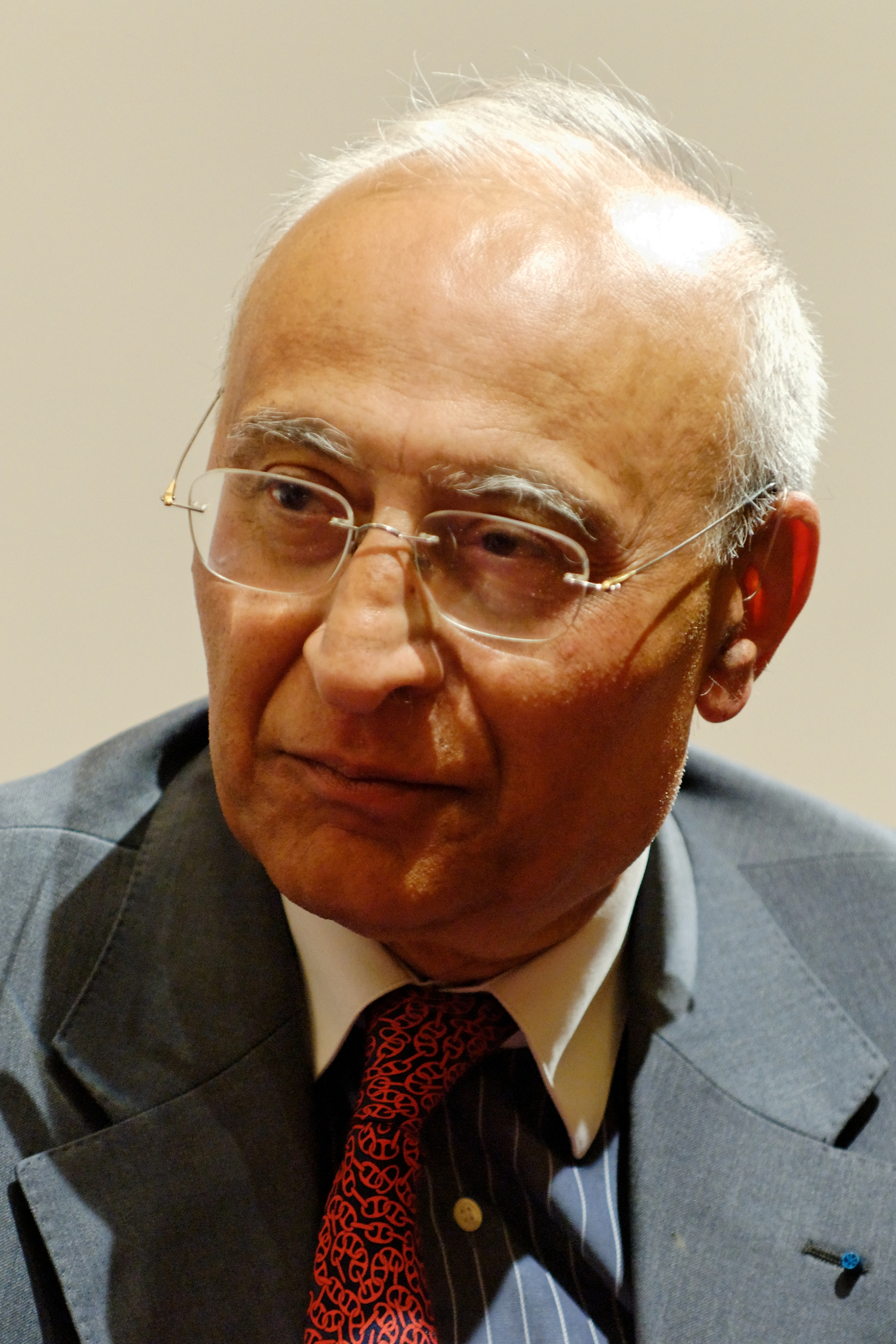
- Iradj Gandjbakhch
- Born: 6 November 1941 (age 84); Tehran, Iran
- Education: University of Paris
- Scientific career
- Fields: Cardiac surgery

Iradj Gandjbaksh (Persian: ایرج گنج‌بخش, born 6 November 1941, in Tehran) is an Iranian Cardiac surgeon who lives in France. He fitted a pacemaker to French former president Jacques Chirac.

== Professional career ==
Gandjbaksh is a surgeon at the Pitié-Salpêtrière Hospital, where he heads the cardiac surgery department after Christian Cabrol. Gandjbaksh and Cabrol performed the first heart transplant in Europe on 27 April 1968. He has been a member of the National Academy of Medicine since 13 November 2001. In 2010, he became president of the National Academy of Surgery. He is also a member of the Board of Directors of the Pierre-et-Marie-Curie University Foundation, where he teaches. He also belonged to the National Council of Universities for the medical, dentistry and pharmaceutical disciplines.

== Works ==
- Heart transplants, with Christian Cabrol and Alain Pavie, Médecine/Sciences, Flammarion, 1996.
- Wounds and trauma of the thorax, with Jean-Pierre Ollivier and René Jancovici, Arnette, 1997.
- Pathologies of the aorta, collective, dir. With Jean-Pierre Ollivier, Med-Line, 2004.

== Honors ==
- Officer of the Order of Merit
- Knight of the Legion of Honour
