= André Brouillet =

French painter (1857–1914)

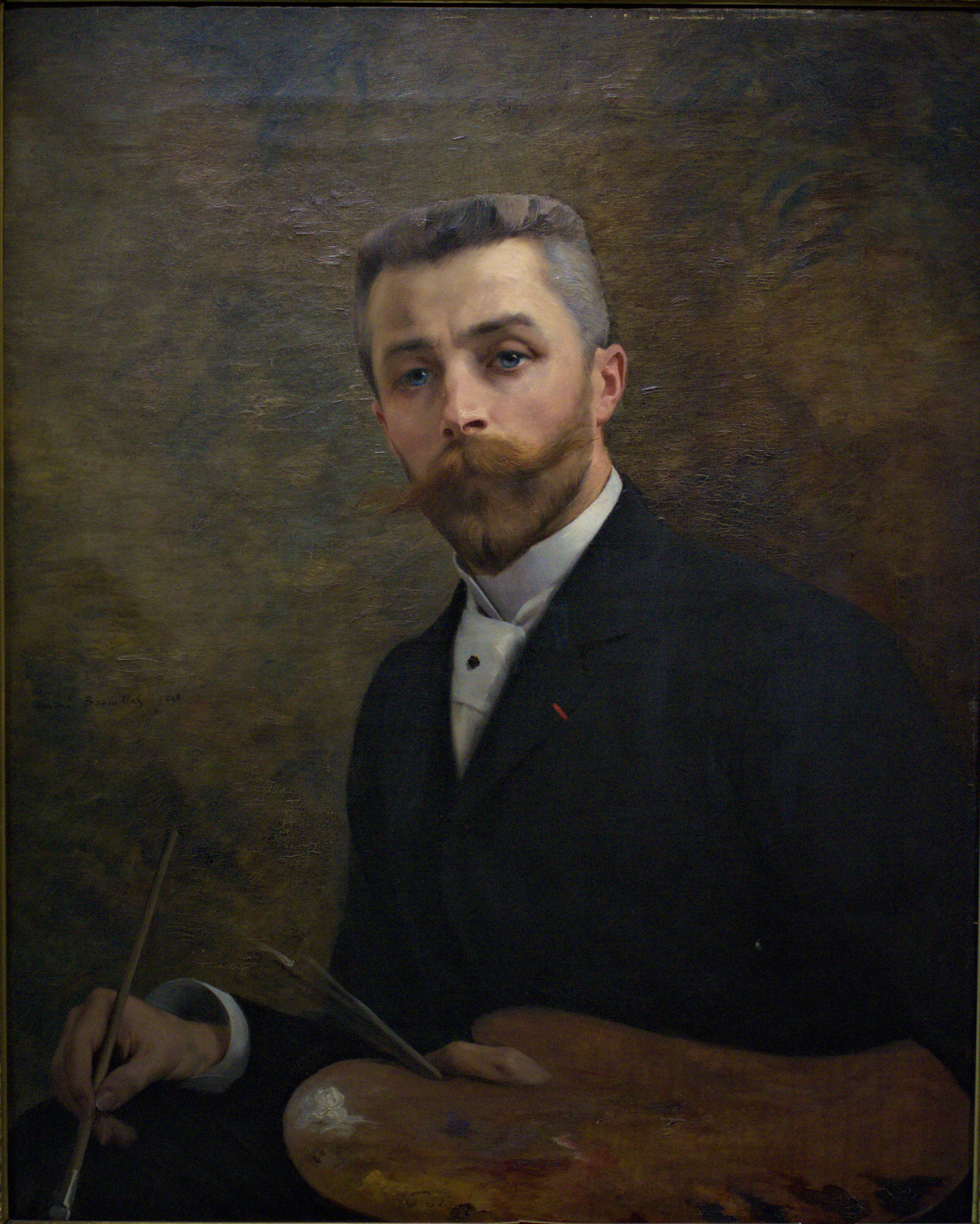
- Self-portrait of Brouillet, 1898
- Born: Pierre Aristide André Brouillet; 1 September 1857; Charroux, Vienne, France
- Died: 6 December 1914 (aged 57); Couhé, Vienne, France
- Education: École Centrale Paris (withdrew); École nationale supérieure des beaux-arts
- Movement: Orientalist painting

Evening on the Moors, 1893, Roubaix Museum of Art and Industry (La Piscine)

Pierre Aristide André Brouillet (French: [bʁujɛ]; 1 September 1857 – 6 December 1914) was a French academic painter specialising in genre painting, portraits and landscapes.

== Life ==
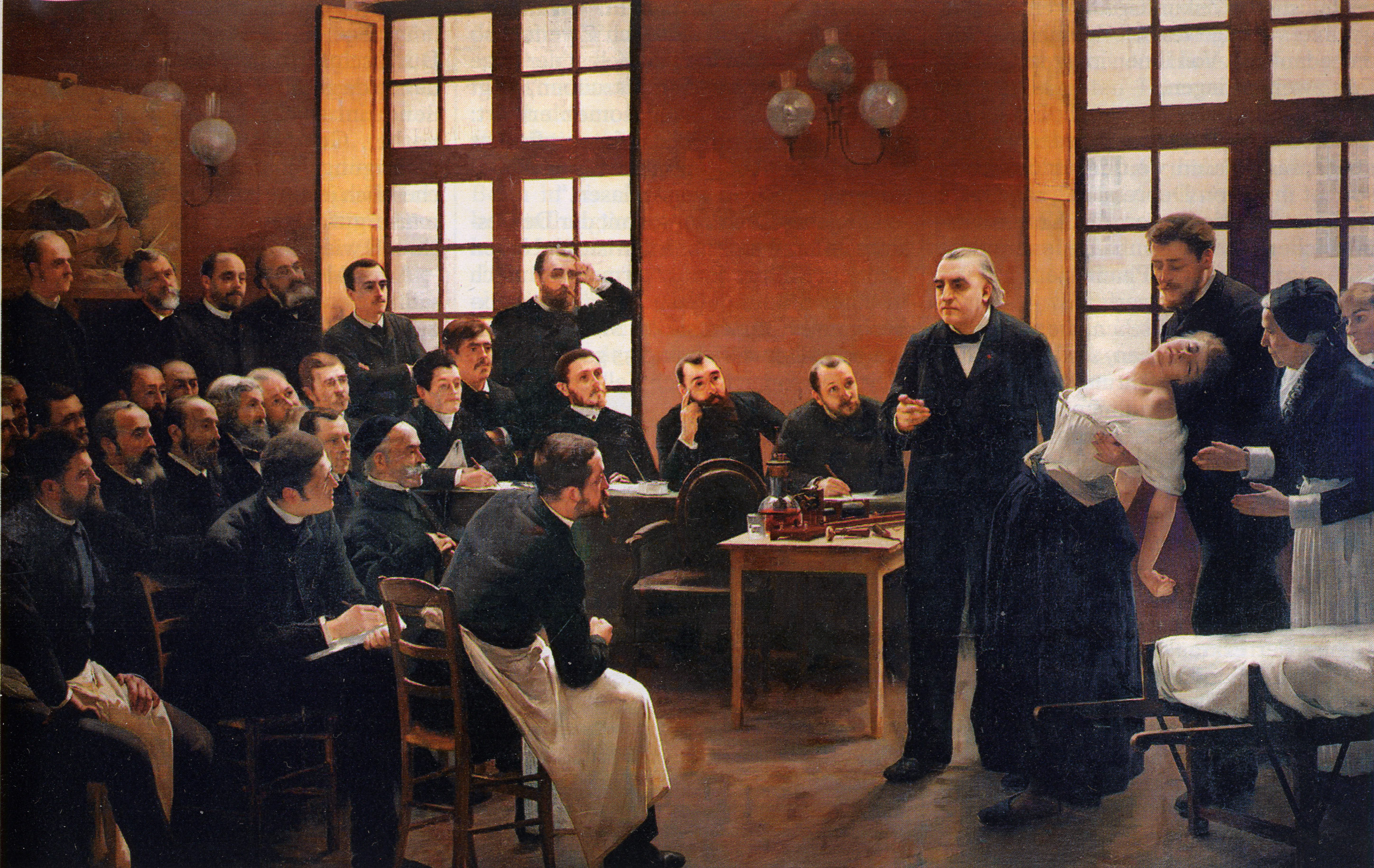
A Clinical Lesson at the Salpêtrière (1887, detail).

Born in Charroux, the son of sculptor Pierre-Amédée Brouillet and Élisabeth Leriget, Brouillet began engineering studies at the École centrale Paris in 1876 before entering the École nationale supérieure des beaux-arts three years later, where he was a student of Jean-Léon Gérôme. In the year of his reception at the Salon de peinture et de sculpture in 1879, he attended Jean-Paul Laurens' lessons.

During his career, he received numerous exhibition awards and numerous public commissions.

He is best known for his painting A Clinical Lesson at the Salpêtrière which represents the neurologist Jean Martin Charcot examining the hysterical patient Marie Wittman, during one of these famous "Tuesday lessons", which he had made a real show. Charcot is represented there with a large number of his students and collaborators, including Théodule-Armand Ribot, Paul Richer and Gilles de La Tourette. The neurologist Joseph Babinski is also present, supporting the patient.

Brouillet is also the author of La Violation du tombeau d'Urgel par les Dominicains L'Exorcisme - Musiciens arabes chassant le djinn du corps d'un enfant, Le Paysan blessé (Salon of 1886), L'Ambulance de la Comédie-Française en 1870 (1891), Le Vaccin du croup à l'hôpital Trousseau (1895), as well as portraits of personalities of the time, including Joseph Babinski.

Influenced by his master Jean-Léon Gérôme, Brouillet devoted himself to orientalist painting, thanks to his discovery of his wife, Emma Isaac, native country, daughter of a rich Constantine Jewish merchant, cousin of Ferdinand Isaac, whose daughter, Yvonne, born out of wedlock in 1889 in Constantine, he even adopted when his mother, Marie-Louise Travers died 19 December 1892. The following year, in 1893, when he returned to France with his adopted daughter, he raised Yvonne as his own daughter, representing her in no less than fourteen paintings. A student of the singer Louise Grandjean, she was hired on June 25, 1911, at the Opéra-Comique as a lyrical singer, under the stage name "Yvonne Florentz" and married the composer Joseph-Eugène Szyfer in 1913.

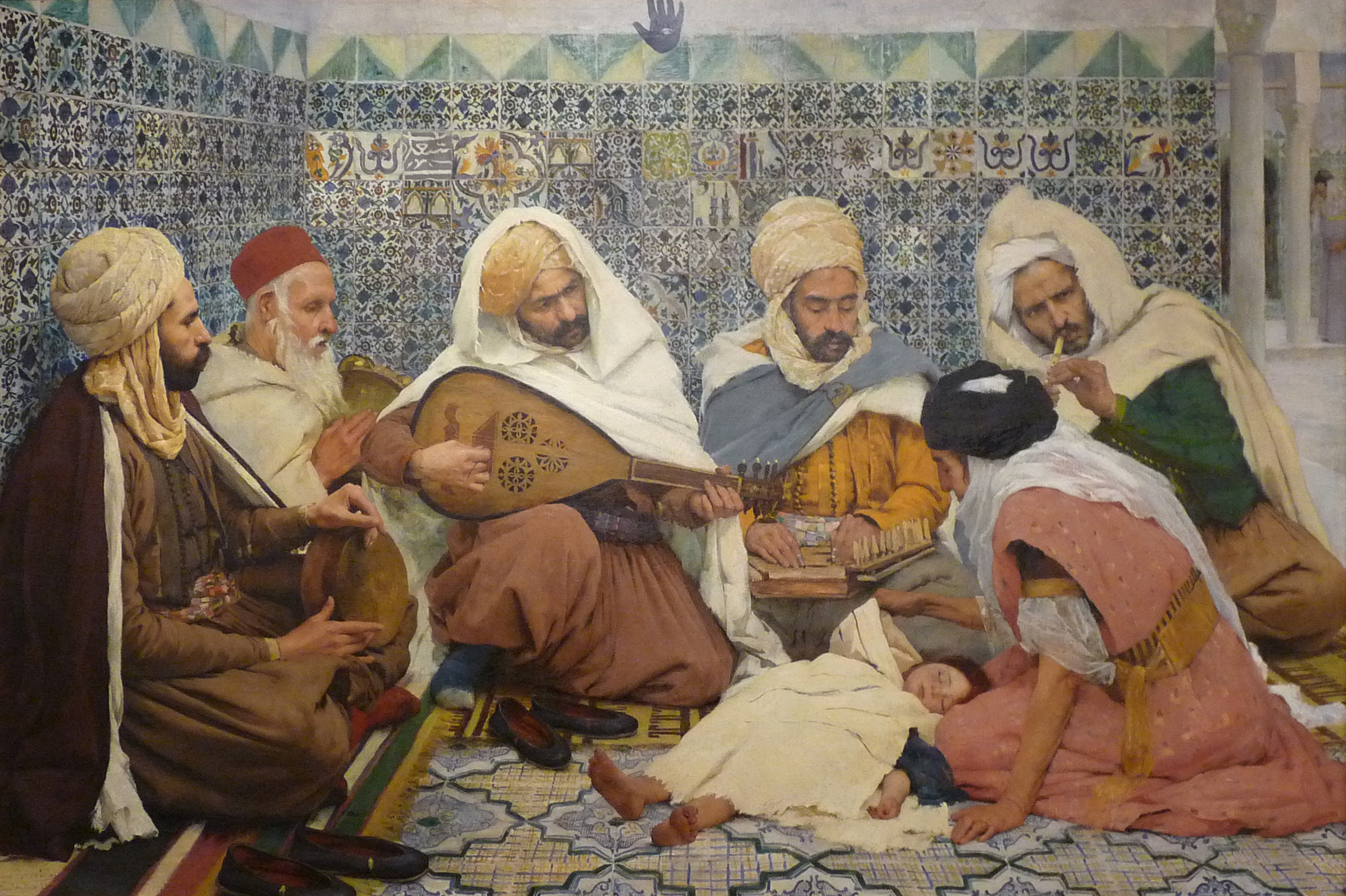
L'Exorcisme - Musiciens arabes chassant le djinn du corps d'un enfant (1884).

Brouillet visited Greece twice, first in 1901 for a state commission (Renan meditating on his prayer on the Acropolis) and then in 1903 to paint th portrait of the Queen Olga of Greece, in 1901. In 1904, the newspaper Fémina consecrated him as the "peintre de la femme". In 1906, he was made an officier of the Légion d'honneur at the same time as he received the gold medal at the Salon where he presented his great composition for the Sorbonne Les étudiants acclament Edgar Quinet et Edmond Michelet le 6 mars 1848 lorsqu'ils reprennent possession de leur chaire.

He left on an icy road to rescue a convoy of Belgian refugees on 6 December 1914, became congested and died a few hours later. His funeral was held in Couhé-Vérac.

== Illustrations ==
Brouillet left an illustrator's pieces for a number of works between 1883 and 1903 and participated in the illustration of the cover of the Figaro illustré of November 1891 and October 1893.

- Le Noël de Lucette by Henry Gréville published in the September 1891 issue of the Figaro illustré
- Une Chasse au loup by Henri Lafontaine published in the November 1893 issue of the Figaro illustré
- Les Découvertes de M. Jean by Émile Desbeaux at P. Ducrocq in 1883.
- Les Contemplations by Victor Hugo published at Testard in 1886, with the engraving Bergère et troupeaux.
- Les Reliques d'amour by Emmanuel Ducros published at Alphonse Lemerre in 1886.
- Steeple-Chase by Paul Bourget published at Alphonse Lemerre in 1894.
- La Volonté du Bonheur by Jules Case, Paris, at Paul Ollendorff in 1895.
- Fort comme la mort by Guy de Maupassant, Paris, at Paul Ollendorff in 1904.
- Une tache d'encre by René Bazin published at Mame in Tours in 1889, couronnée par l'Académie française en 1904.
- Les Musardises, La Brouette by Edmond Rostand, Paris, librairie Pierre Lafitte & Cie, 1910, p. 160.

== Sources ==
- Dossier de Légion d'honneur d'André Brouillet.
