= Charcot shower =

Type of high-pressure shower

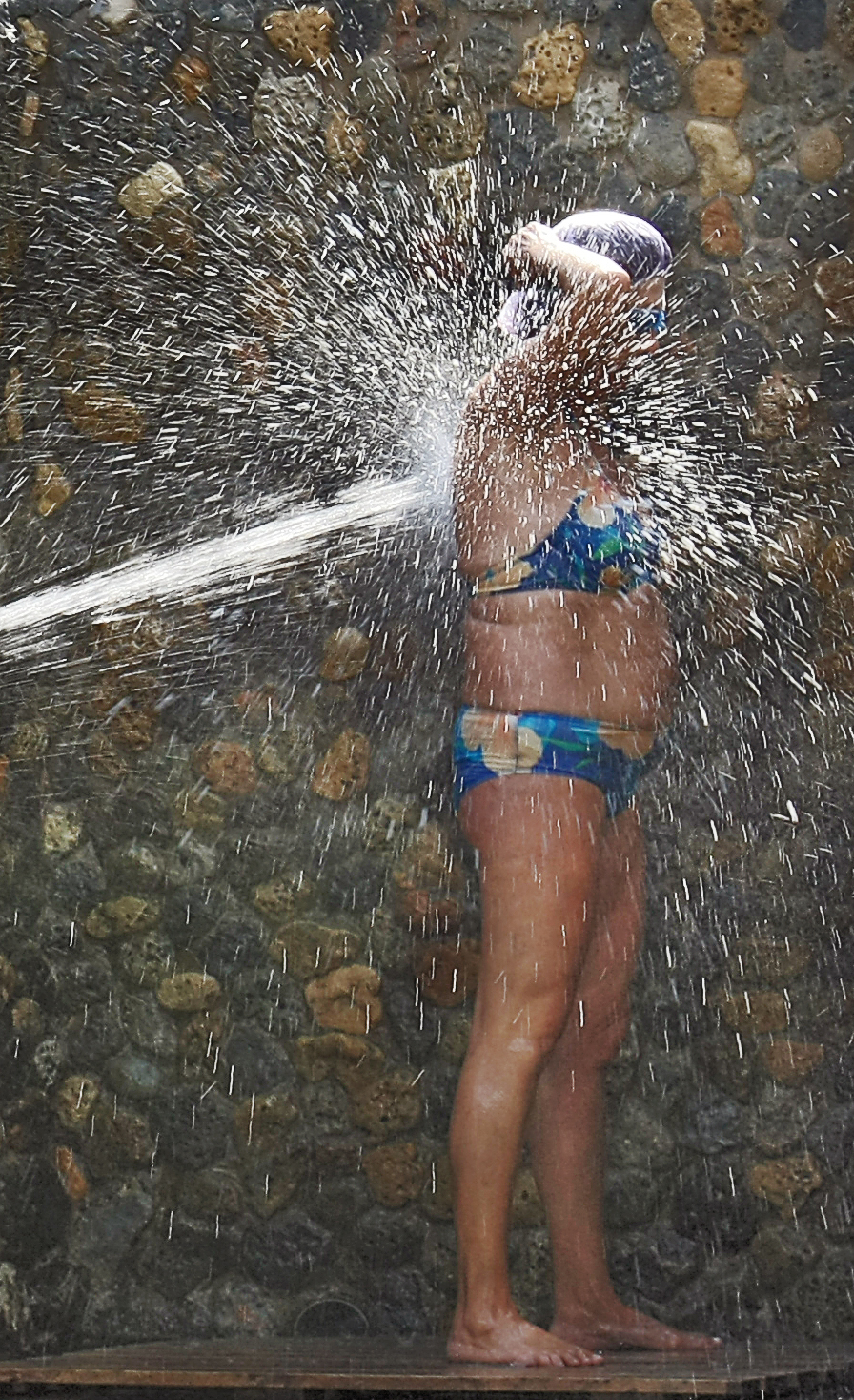

The Charcot shower or Charcot douche (alternatively spelled Charko, Scharko, Sharko, Skharko or Šarko) is a type of high-pressure shower invented by the French neurologist Jean-Martin Charcot in the late 19th century. It was originally used as a medical device for stress relief, but became popular in spas in the late 19th and early 20th centuries.

== Characteristics ==
The device projects water under high pressure from a shower head, enabling an extra-strong massage over the patient's entire body. It is applied from a distance of 3.0–3.5 m (9.8–11.5 ft) using water at a temperature of 15–20 °C (59–68 °F) and at a pressure of 1.5–3 atmospheres. It is a unique invention of the celebrated neurologist Jean-Martin Charcot. Jean-Martin Charcot believed that the procedure of such water massage can combat stress and strengthen the human nervous system. Over time, it became clear that the Charcot shower has "side" effects, namely, improving blood and lymph circulation, increasing skin and muscle tone, improving the immune system, and normalizing weight.

During the shower, mechanical and thermal stimulation of the skin occurs, which leads to a stimulating effect on the circulatory system and lymph circulation, active oxygen saturation and additional tissue nutrition.

It is recommended to do at least 10 procedures. Contraindications to the use of the Charcot shower procedure: acute fevers, acute infectious diseases, oncological diseases, etc.
