= Paul Richer =

French anatomist, physiologist and sculptor

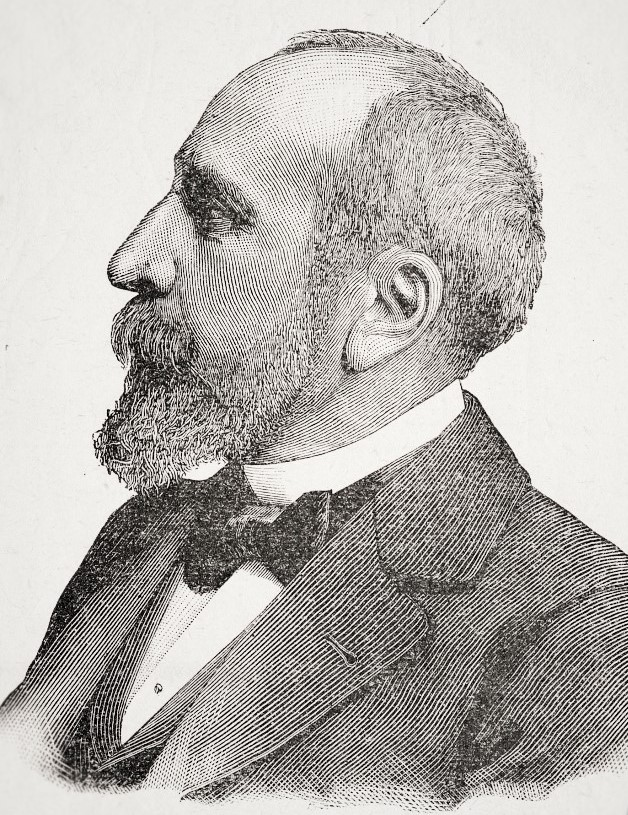
Paul Richer

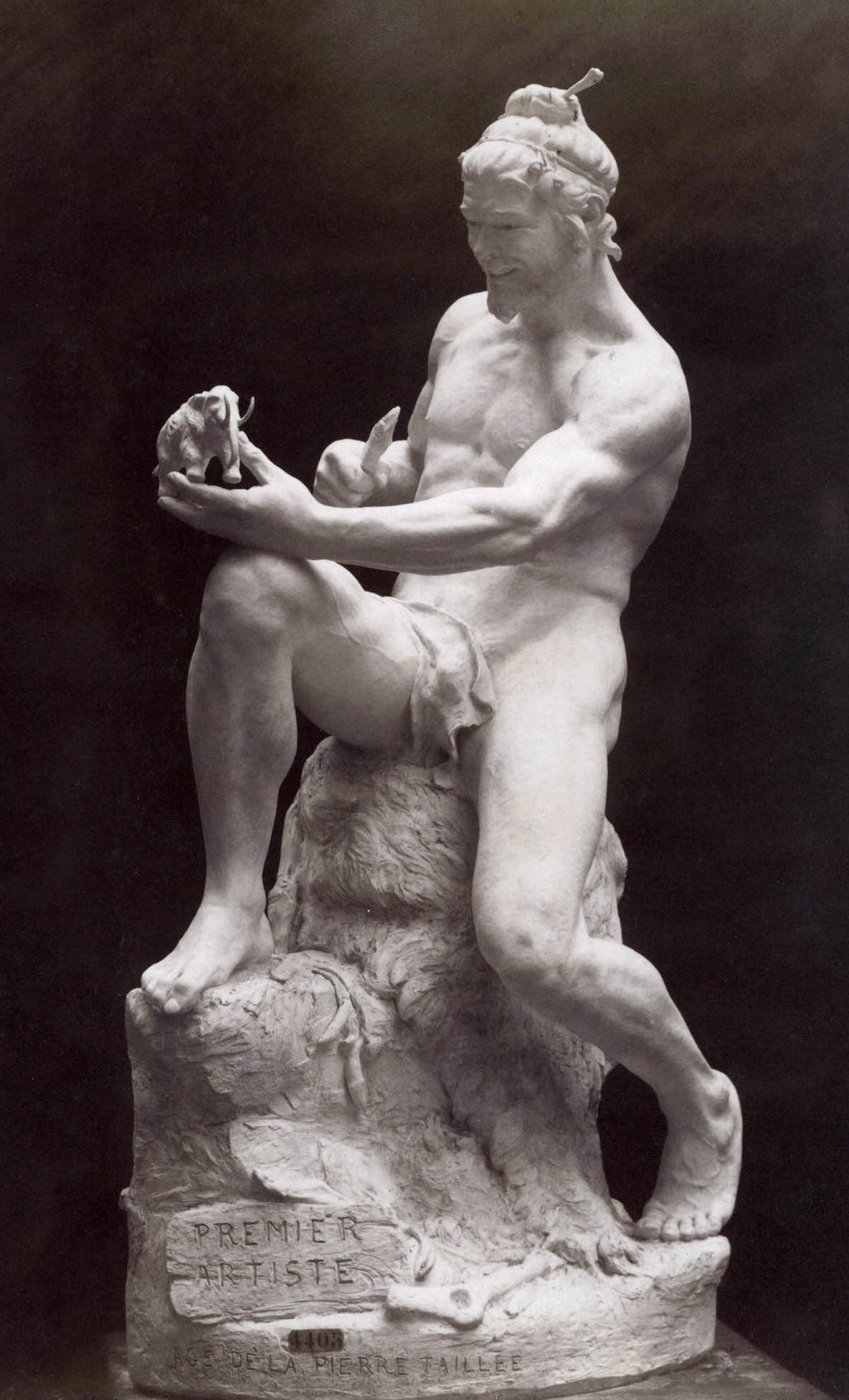
Sculpture "First Artist, carved stone age" by Paul Richier. Plaster, Salon des Artiste Français of 1890.

Paul Marie Louis Pierre Richer (17 January 1849 – 17 December 1933) was a French anatomist, physiologist, sculptor, medallist, and anatomical artist who was a native of Chartres. He was a professor of artistic anatomy at the École nationale supérieure des Beaux-Arts in Paris, as well as a member of the Académie Nationale de Médecine (1898).

Richer was an assistant to Jean-Martin Charcot at the Salpêtrière, and from 1882 to 1896 was chief of the laboratory at the Salpêtrière Hospital. With Charcot he performed research of hysteria and epilepsy, and also performed studies of medicine and its relationship to art.

In 1903, Richer was appointed to the chair of artistic anatomy at the École des Beaux-Arts, and in 1907-08 was president of the Société Française d'Histoire de la Médecine (French Society for the History of Medicine). His sculptures can be found in museums throughout Europe, including the Musée d'Orsay. His work was part of the sculpture event in the art competition at the 1924 Summer Olympics.

== Medallic art ==
- 1899 plaquette 50 Years' Jubilee of the Société de biologie.
- 1900 plaquette Prof. Dr Raphael Blanchard.
- 1902 plaquette Prof. Dr E. J. Marey.
- 1903 plaquette Prof. Dr J. B. A. Chauveau. A remarkable work.
- 1906 plaquette International Medical Congress at Lisbon, etc.

== Published works ==
- Étude descriptive de la grande attaque hystérique ou attaque hystéro-épileptique et de ses principales variétés (1879)
- Études cliniques sur l'hystéro-épilepsie ou grande hystérie (1881)
- Les Démoniaques dans l'art, with Jean-Martin Charcot (1887)
- Hypnotisme, with Georges Gilles de la Tourette (1887)
- Dictionnaire encyclopédique des sciences médicales, with Georges Gilles de la Tourette (1887)
- Nouvelle Iconographie de la Salpêtrière (1888–1917)
- Les Difformes et les malades dans l'art, with Jean-Martin Charcot (1889)
- Anatomie artistique : description des formes extérieures du corps humain au repos et dans les principaux mouvements: avec 110 planches renfermant plus de 300 figures dessinées (1890)
- Paralysies et contractures hystériques (1892)
- L'Anatomie dans l'art : proportions du corps humain, canons artistiques et canons scientifiques, conférence faite à l'Association française pour l'avancement des sciences (1893)
- Physiologie artistique de l'homme en mouvement (1895)
- Dialogues sur l'art et la science (1897)
- Introduction à l'étude de la figure humaine (1902)
- Nouvelle anatomie artistique du corps humain (6 volumes, 1906–1929), including Morphologie: la femme (1920).
- Nouvelle anatomie artistique. Les animaux (1910)
- Lettre à en-tête de l"Institut de France (1925)

== English translations ==
- Artistic Anatomy, translated and edited by Robert Beverly Hale (1971)
- New Artistic Anatomy: Female Morphology, translated and edited by Allana M. Benham (2015)

== See also ==
- A Clinical Lesson at the Salpêtrière – 1887 group tableau portrait by André Brouillet
