= Jean-Martin Charcot =

French neurologist (1825–1893)

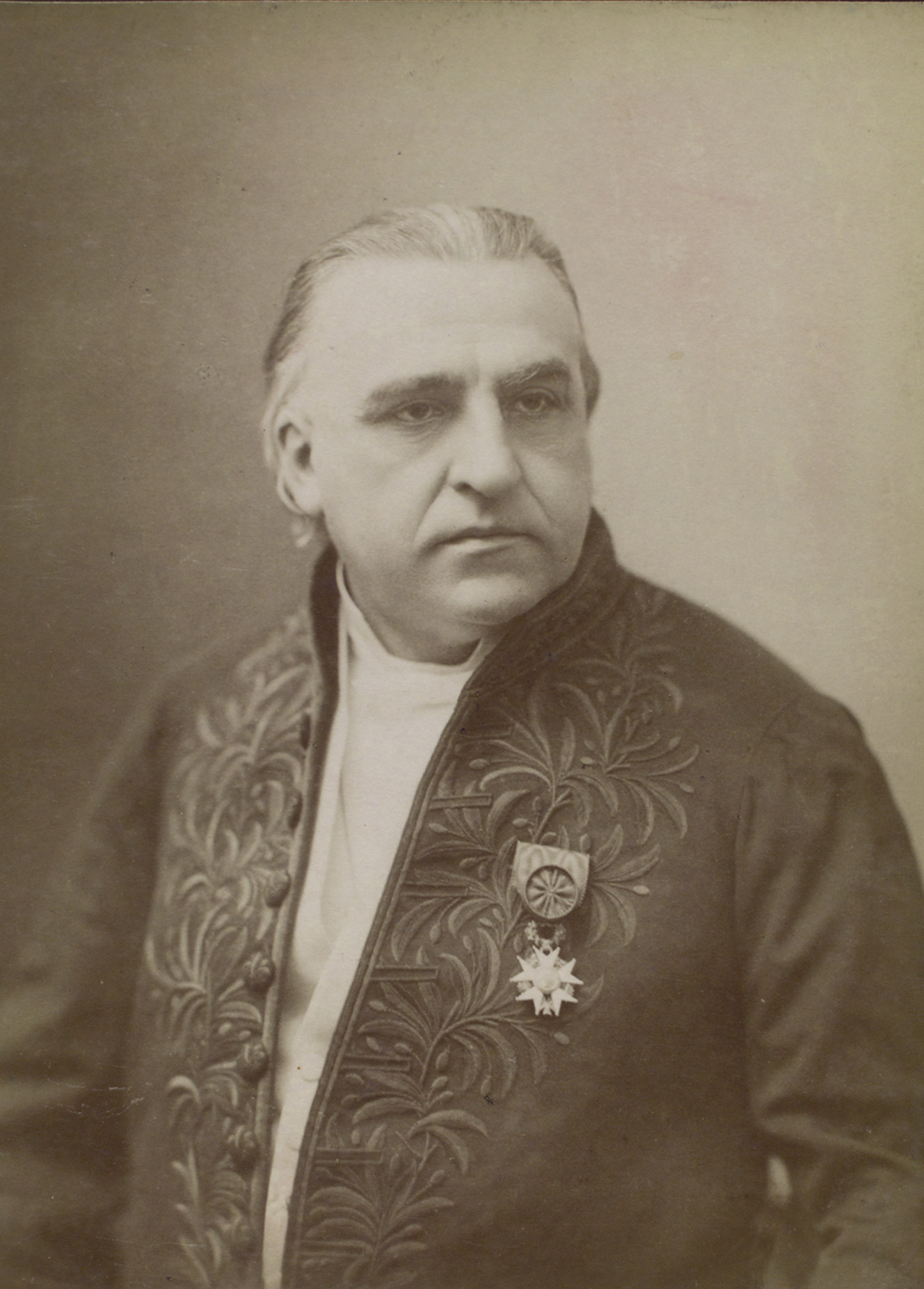
- Wearing Legion of Honour Officier, with rosette
- Born: 29 November 1825; Paris, Kingdom of France
- Died: 16 August 1893 (aged 67); Lac des Settons, French Republic
- Education: University of Paris
- Known for: Studying and discovering neurological diseases
- Children: 2
- Awards: Legion of Honour – Commander (1892)
- Scientific career
- Fields: Neurologist and professor of anatomical pathology
- Workplaces: Salpêtrière Hospital
- Doctoral students: Pierre Janet; Albert Pitres

Jean-Martin Charcot (French: [ʒɑ̃ maʁtɛ̃ ʃaʁko] zhahn mar-TAN shar-KOH; 29 November 1825 – 16 August 1893) was a French neurologist and professor of anatomical pathology. He worked on groundbreaking work about hypnosis and hysteria, in particular with his hysteria patient Louise Augustine Gleizes. Charcot is known as "the founder of modern neurology", and his name has been associated with at least 15 medical eponyms, including various conditions sometimes referred to as Charcot diseases.

Charcot has been referred to as "the father of French neurology and one of the world's pioneers of neurology". His work greatly influenced the developing fields of neurology and psychology; modern psychiatry owes much to the work of Charcot and his direct followers. He was the "foremost neurologist of late nineteenth-century France" and has been called "the Napoleon of the neuroses".

== Life ==
Born in Paris, Charcot worked and taught at the famous Salpêtrière Hospital for 33 years. His reputation as an instructor drew students from all over Europe. In 1882, he established a neurology clinic at Salpêtrière, which was the first of its kind in Europe. Charcot was a part of the French neurological tradition and studied under, and greatly revered, Duchenne de Boulogne.

"He married a rich widow, Madame Durvis, in 1864 and had three children, Jeanne, Jean-Paul and Jean-Baptiste, who later became a doctor and a famous polar explorer".

He has been described as an atheist.

== Career ==
=== Neurology ===
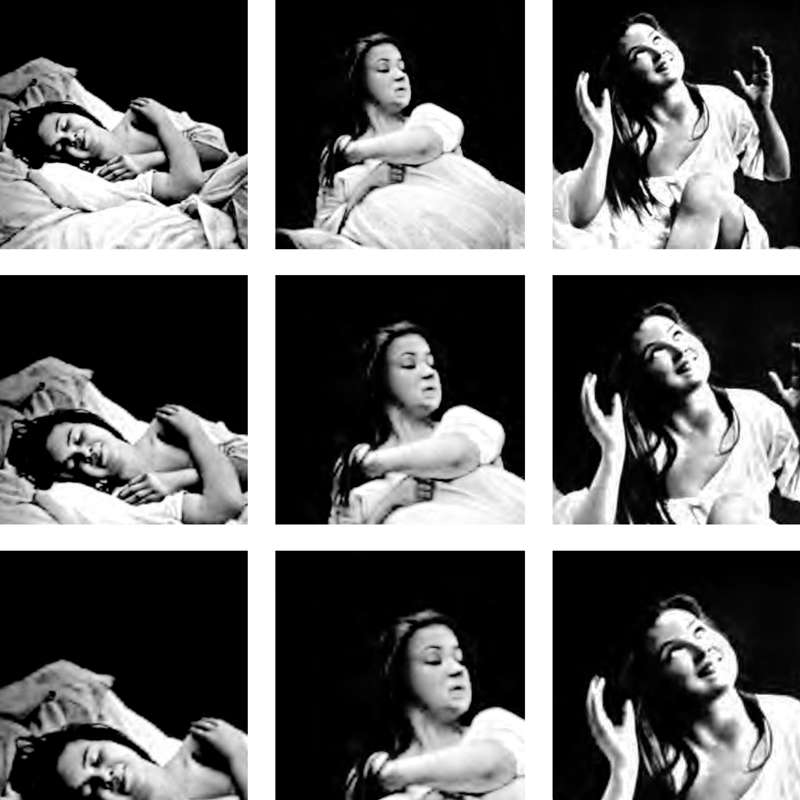
Charcot uses hypnotism to treat hysteria and other abnormal mental conditions. All materials from Iconographie photographique de la Salpêtrière (Jean Martin Charcot, 1878)

Charcot's primary focus was neurology. He named and was the first to describe multiple sclerosis. Summarizing previous reports and adding his own clinical and pathological observations, Charcot called the disease sclérose en plaques. The three signs of multiple sclerosis now known as Charcot's triad 1 are nystagmus, intention tremor, and telegraphic speech, though these are not unique to MS. Charcot also observed cognition changes, describing his patients as having a "marked enfeeblement of the memory" and "conceptions that formed slowly". He was also the first to describe a disorder known as Charcot joint or Charcot arthropathy, a degeneration of joint surfaces resulting from loss of proprioception. He researched the functions of different parts of the brain and the role of arteries in cerebral hemorrhage. In collaboration with his student Albert Pitres, Charcot conducted studies on the cerebral localisations, which enabled the identification of motor cortex areas, and demonstrated that motor cortex lesions lead to degeneration of the pyramidal tracts.

Charcot was among the first to describe Charcot–Marie–Tooth disease (CMT). The announcement was made simultaneously with Pierre Marie of France (his resident) and Howard Henry Tooth of England. The disease is also sometimes called peroneal muscular atrophy.

Charcot's studies between 1868 and 1881 were a landmark in the understanding of Parkinson's disease. Among other advances he made the distinction between rigidity, weakness and bradykinesia. He also led the disease formerly named paralysis agitans (shaking palsy) to be renamed after James Parkinson. He also noted apparent variations on PD, such as Parkinson's disease with hyperextension. Charcot received the first European professional chair of clinical diseases for the nervous system in 1882.

=== Studies on hypnosis and hysteria ===
Charcot is best known today for his work on hypnosis and hysteria. In particular, he is best remembered for his work with his hysteria patient Louise Augustine Gleizes, who somewhat increased his fame during his lifetime; however, Marie "Blanche" Wittmann, known as the Queen of Hysterics, was his most famous hysteria patient at the time. He initially believed that hysteria was a neurological disorder for which patients were pre-disposed by hereditary features of their nervous system, but near the end of his life he concluded that hysteria was a psychological disease.

Charcot first began studying hysteria after creating a special ward for non-insane females with "hystero-epilepsy". He discovered two distinct forms of hysteria among these women: minor hysteria and major hysteria. His interest in hysteria and hypnotism "developed at a time when the general public was fascinated in 'animal magnetism' and 'mesmerization'", which was later revealed to be a method of inducing hypnosis. His study of hysteria "attract[ed] both scientific and social notoriety". Bogousslavsky, Walusinski, and Veyrunes write:

Charcot and his school considered the ability to be hypnotized as a clinical feature of hysteria ... For the members of the Salpêtrière School, susceptibility to hypnotism was synonymous with disease, i.e. hysteria, although they later recognized ... that grand hypnotisme (in hysterics) should be differentiated from petit hypnotisme, which corresponded to the hypnosis of ordinary people.

Charcot argued vehemently against the widespread medical and popular prejudice that hysteria was rarely found in men, presenting several cases of traumatic male hysteria. He taught that due to this prejudice these "cases often went unrecognised, even by distinguished doctors" and could occur in such models of masculinity as railway engineers or soldiers. Charcot's analysis, in particular his view of hysteria as an organic condition which could be caused by trauma, paved the way for understanding neurological symptoms arising from industrial-accident or war-related traumas.

The Salpêtrière School's position on hypnosis was sharply criticized by Hippolyte Bernheim, another leading neurologist of the time. Bernheim argued that the hypnosis and hysteria phenomena that Charcot had famously demonstrated were in fact due to suggestion. However, Charcot himself had had longstanding concerns about the use of hypnosis in treatment and about its effect on patients. He also was concerned that the sensationalism hypnosis attracted had robbed it of its scientific interest, and that the quarrel with Bernheim, amplified by Charcot's pupil Georges Gilles de la Tourette, had "damaged" hypnotism.

=== Arts ===
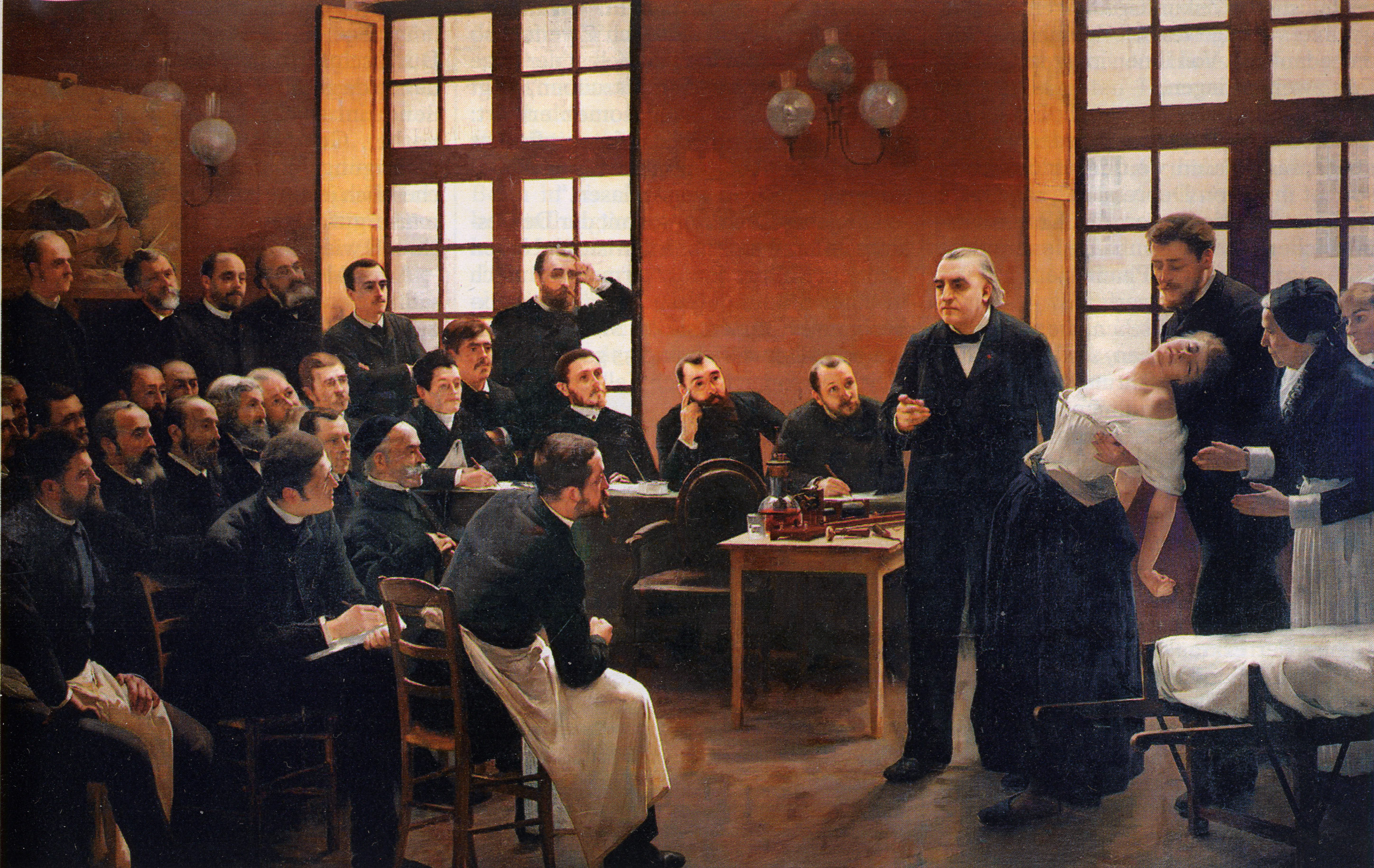
The painting A Clinical Lesson at the Salpêtrière by Pierre Aristide André Brouillet. This painting shows Charcot demonstrating hypnosis on a "hysterical" Salpêtrière patient, "Blanche" (Marie "Blanche" Wittmann), who is supported by Dr. Joseph Babiński (rear). Note the similarity to the illustration of opisthotonus (tetanus) on the back wall.

Charcot thought of art as a crucial tool of the clinicoanatomic method. He used photos and drawings, many made by himself or his students, in his classes and conferences. He also drew outside the neurology domain, as a personal hobby. Like Duchenne, he is considered a key figure in the incorporation of photography to the study of neurological cases.

=== Distorted views of Charcot ===
Distorted views of Charcot as harsh and tyrannical have arisen from some sources that rely on a fanciful autobiographical novel by Axel Munthe, The Story of San Michele (1929). Munthe claimed to have been Charcot's assistant, but in fact, Munthe was just a medical student among hundreds of others. Munthe's most direct contact with Charcot was when Munthe helped a young female patient "escape" from a ward of the hospital and took her into his home. Charcot threatened to report this to the police, and ordered that Munthe not be allowed on the wards of the hospital again.

In a 1931 letter to The New York Times Book Review, Charcot's son Jean-Baptiste Charcot, who had, himself, been a formal student of his father at the Salpêtrière, emphatically stated:

"I can certify that Dr Munthe never was trained by my father"; and, further, that "[although Munthe] may have [incidentally] followed, like hundreds of others, some courses of Charcot, ...he was not trained by him and certainly never had the intimacy of which he boasts [in his recently reviewed work, Memories and Vagaries]. ...I was, myself, a student at the Salpetriere then, and can certify that he was not one of his students and that my father never knew him. Everything he says about professor Charcot is false...."

Bengt Jangfeldt, in his 2008 biography, Axel Munthe: The Road to San Michele, states that "Charcot is not mentioned in a single letter of Axel's out of the hundreds that have been preserved from his Paris years" (p. 96).

== Legacy ==
One of Charcot's greatest legacies as a clinician is his contribution to the development of systematic neurological examination, correlating a set of clinical signs with specific lesions. This was made possible by his pioneering long-term studies of patients, coupled with microscopic and anatomic analysis derived from eventual autopsies. This led to the first clear delineation of various neurological diseases and classic description of them, such as amyotrophic lateral sclerosis.

Charcot is just as famous for his influence on those who had studied with him: Sigmund Freud, Joseph Babinski, Jean Leguirec, Pierre Janet, William James, Pierre Marie, Albert Londe, Charles-Joseph Bouchard, Georges Gilles de la Tourette, Alfred Binet, and Albert Pitres. Among the doctors trained by Charcot at the beginning of the 20th century account the Spanish neuropathologists Nicolás Achúcarro and Gonzalo Rodríguez Lafora, two distinguished disciples of Santiago Ramón y Cajal and members of the Spanish Neurological School.

Charcot bestowed the eponym for Tourette syndrome in honor of his student, Georges Gilles de la Tourette.

Although, by the 1870s, Charcot was France's best known physician, his ideas about hysteria were later refuted, and French psychiatry did not recover for decades. An example of the dismissal of Charcot's views can be found in Edward Shorter's History of Psychiatry: Shorter states that Charcot understood "almost nothing" about major psychiatric illness, and that he was "quite lacking in common sense and grandiosely sure of his own judgement". This perspective overlooks the fact that Charcot never claimed to be a psychiatrist or to be practising psychiatry, a field that was separately organized from neurology within France's educational and public health systems. After Charcot's death, the phenomenon of "hysteria" that he had described was no longer recognized as a real neurological condition, but was considered to be an "artifact of suggestion". However, Charcot continued to have a "prominent" position in French psychiatry and psychology.

The negative evaluation of Charcot's work on hysteria was influenced by a significant shift in diagnostic criteria and understanding of hysteria which occurred in the decades following his death. The historical perspective on Charcot's work on hysteria has also been distorted by viewing him as a precursor of Freud. After Charcot's death, Freud and Janet wrote articles on his importance. However, Charcot's work on hysteria and hypnotism was at odds with the perspective Freud made famous, since Charcot believed in neurological determinism.

The Charcot-Janet school, which formed from the work of Charcot and his student Janet, contributed greatly to knowledge of multiple personality disorders.

=== Influence on the development of anti-Semitism ===
Charcot claimed to have observed a higher prevalence of diseases with a hereditary component (notably arthritis and neurological disorders) in Jewish communities, where limited numbers combined with longterm endogamy. He also used Jewish patients as examples in some of his public lectures.

When these claims were developed by neurologist Henry Meige, and others, in conjunction with the myth of the Wandering Jew, this was used as support by the apostles of French anti-Semitism, notably the journalist Edouard Drumont. However, historian of science Ian Hacking cautions that Charcot's interest in Jews and his claims about them must be seen in their nuanced, ambiguous context: "notice how Charcot shared most of the presuppositions of the genetic approach to mental illness that are current today [1998]. He could not fall back on a genome project to support his scientific speculations, but he did have a closed gene pool to study, not just in that Jews were endogamous, but because many Jews in his clinic were descended from relatives, even cousins, who married each other. Scientific reasoning could motivate his constant attention to Jewish family lines, thus a reputable scientific quest merged with a great willingness to see Jews as aberrant, troublesome, ill."

By the very end of the 19th century, anti-Semitism in France had rapidly ascended, due to the Dreyfus affair. "Because of this transition, it has become all too easy to read gross and manifest anti-Semitism" retrospectively into the hospital wards of one or two decades previous.

=== Awards ===
By decree on 22 April 1858, Charcot was made a Knight of France's Legion of Honour. He was subsequently promoted in rank to Officer (decree: 4 April 1880), and then finally Commander (decree: 12 January 1892).

=== Other ===
A collection of Charcot's correspondence is held at the United States National Library of Medicine.

Charcot Island in Antarctica was discovered by his son, Jean-Baptiste Charcot, who named the Island in honor of his father.

The Charcot Award is given every two years by the Multiple Sclerosis International Federation for a lifetime of outstanding research into the understanding or treatment of multiple sclerosis.

=== Eponyms ===
Charcot's name is associated with many diseases and conditions including:

- Charcot's artery (lenticulostriate artery)
- Charcot's joint (diabetic arthropathy)
- Charcot's disease (amyotrophic lateral sclerosis, the most-common subtype of motor neurone disease—also known as Lou Gehrig's disease)
- Charcot–Marie–Tooth disease (peripheral muscular atrophy), named with Pierre Marie and Howard Henry Tooth
- Charcot–Wilbrand syndrome (visual agnosia and loss of ability to revisualise images), named with Hermann Wilbrand
- Charcot's intermittent hepatic fever (intermittent pain, intermittent fever, intermittent jaundice, and loss of weight)
- Charcot–Bouchard aneurysms (tiny aneurysms of the penetrating branches of middle cerebral artery in hypertensives), named with Charles-Joseph Bouchard
- Charcot's triad of acute cholangitis (right upper quadrant pain, jaundice, and fever)
- Charcot's neurologic triad of multiple sclerosis (nystagmus, intention tremor, and dysarthria)
- Charcot–Leyden crystals due to the lysis of eosinophils in cases of allergic diseases, named with Ernst Viktor von Leyden
- Souques–Charcot geroderma: a variant of Hutchinson–Gilford disease, named with Alexandre-Achille Souques
- Charcot–Gombault necrosis: a biliary infarct, named with Albert Gombault

His name is also associated with a type of high-pressure shower.

== In popular culture ==
A 2024 award-winning historical literary novel The Dream Collector - Sabrine & Sigmund Freud by R.w. Meek, published by Historium Press, explores the relationship between Dr. Charcot and his patient known as the Princess of Hysteria; the secrets of Charcot's stenographer, Julie Forette, and the blossoming dream interpretations of his new intern, a young Sigmund Freud. Winner of the 2022 Palm Beach Book Festival book contest, and the 2023 Runner-up for book of the year at The Historical Fiction Company.

In literature, Charcot's hypnosis is mentioned in Bram Stoker's novel Dracula. He figures in Per Olov Enquist's 2004 novel The Book about Blanche and Marie, and in the 2005 novel by Sebastian Faulks, Human Traces, as well as Alasdair Gray's 1992 Poor Things.

A 2012 French historical drama film Augustine, is about a fictional love affair between Charcot and his patient Louise Augustine Gleizes, who was known as Augustine or A. Charcot is a central figure in the 2021 French film, The Mad Women's Ball.

The 2024 novel The Madwomen of Paris by Jennifer Cody Epstein features Charcot as a major historical figure and explores the lives of several of his patients through historical fiction.

In music, the Scottish experimental hip hop group Hector Bizerk wrote the song "Dr. Charcot" for their 2015 album The Waltz Of Modern Psychiatry. Charcot is the main character of the song "Let Yourself Go" from The Alan Parsons Project 1990 album Freudiana.

== Quotations ==
- "In the last analysis, we see only what we are ready to see, what we have been taught to see. We eliminate and ignore everything that is not a part of our prejudices."
- "To learn how to treat a disease, one must learn how to recognize it. The diagnosis is the best trump in the scheme of treatment."
- "Symptoms, then, are in reality nothing but a cry from suffering organs."
- "If you do not have a proven treatment for certain illnesses, bid [sic] your time, do what you can, but do not harm your patients."
- "...perfectly legitimate pathological phenomena, in which the will of the patient counts for nothing, absolutely nothing"; in reference to the clinical features of hysteria.

== Bibliography ==
- Neurologie, [s.l.], [s.n.], [s.d.], manuscrit de 395 feuillets (fonds : manuscrits des leçons de J.M.Charcot).
- Leçons cliniques sur les maladies des vieillards et les maladies chroniques. Paris: Adrien Delahaye, 1874.
- Exposé des titres scientifiques. Versailles: Imprimeries Cerf, 1878.
- Sur les divers états nerveux déterminés par l'hypnotisation chez les hystériques. In Comptes Rendues hebdomadaires des séances de l'Académie des Sciences 94 (1882): 403-405.
- Leçons sur les maladies du système nerveux. Paris: Delahaye et Lecrosnier, 1885-1887.
- Avec Paul Richer, Les Démoniaques dans l'art. Paris: Delahaye et Lecrosnier, 1887.
- Avec Paul Richer, Les Difformes et les Malades dans l'art, Lecrosnier et Babé, 1889.
- La foi qui guérit [archive]. Paris: Felix Alcan, 1897. 38 p.

== See also ==
- A Clinical Lesson at the Salpêtrière – 1887 group tableau portrait by André Brouillet
- Henri-Étienne Beaunis – French physiologist, psychologist, and founding member of the Nancy School of Hypnosis
- Hippolyte Bernheim – French physician, neurologist, and founding member of the Nancy School of Hypnosis
- Female hysteria – Outdated diagnosis for women
- History of hypnosis
- Hypnotic susceptibility – Measure of how easily a person can be hypnotized
- Hysteria – Excess, ungovernable emotion
- Ambroise-Auguste Liébeault – French physician and founding member of the Nancy School of Hypnosis
- Jules Liégeois – French jurist, academic, and founding member of the Nancy School of Hypnosis
- Lourdes apparitions – 1858 reported supernatural activity in Lourdes, France
- Suggestibility – Inclination to accept the suggestions of others
- Suggestion – Psychological process of guiding a person
- The Nancy School of Hypnosis – French school of psychotherapy from 1866
