= Gabrielle Bompard =

Accused murderer in the 1889 Gouffé Case

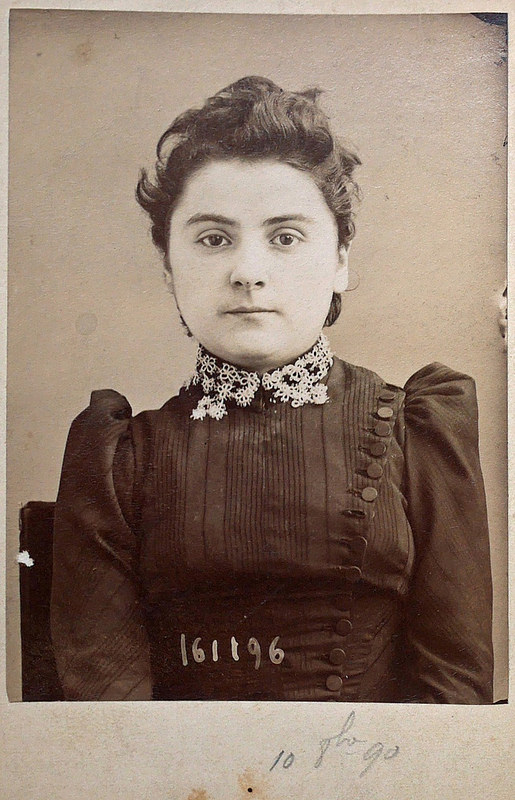
- Gabrielle Bompard (10 October 1890)
- Born: 1868
- Died: not known
- Known for: French murderer in the 1889 Gouffé Case

Gabrielle Bompard (born 1868) was a French murderer in the 1889 Gouffé Case who, conspiring with Michel Eyraud, was responsible for the homicide by strangulation of the bailiff Gouffé after luring him into her home, which fascinated the public and media in France and abroad due to her claim of being under hypnosis. Bompard claimed that Eyraud had hypnotized her and therefore she should not be found guilty in Gouffé’s murder. The credibility of this defense was heavily debated and the subject of conflicting expert testimony. However, Bompard won the hypnosis argument, and while she was found guilty, she escaped full blame and the guillotine, instead receiving hard labor. Bompard became a famous and popular figure in the fin-de-siècle during the murder trial due to the attention the case received in the press and how Bompard seemed to enjoy that attention and parade her newfound celebrity.

== Early life ==
Bompard was born in 1868, the fourth child to a merchant and sickly mother. Her father was from Lille and considered a strong, hardworking, respectable man. Her mother died of lung disease when Bompard was 13.

As a child and adolescent, Bompard was reportedly cruel and deceitful, caring only about men and clothing. She was kicked out of four schools for bad behavior, but eventually remained in a fifth for three years. She had a poor reputation as a lewd, morally corrupt, lying girl with dirty language and bad habits. Upon turning 18, she returned to her father's house briefly before leaving with a man who she after claimed had hypnotized and seduced her.

Throughout her early life, Bompard appeared to be hypnotized very easily, a trait that came in significance during the Gouffé Case. Her father hired a doctor to fix her bad behavior by appealing to her in a hypnotic state but this was unsuccessful. The doctor called her a neuropath and claimed her poor conduct and unprincipled manner was the result of her upbringing lacking certain features. A later mental and physical examination by a different doctor found that she was extremely immoral, self-obsessed, narcissistic, lewd, sinister, unserious, could not distinguish good and bad values, and although clever, never used her cleverness to improve her conduct.

== Crime ==
Michel Eyraud was 46 at the time of his association with Bompard and the murder. He was a former distiller at Sévres, but was working as a commission agent at a bankrupt firm. He was married but practiced infidelity as Bompard, who was 22, was his mistress at the time of the murder. They have both been described as amoral in character. Eyraud had an unpleasant temper, saw industriousness as a bad quality, and was broke from spending all his money on debauchery.

The plan to kill Gouffé was made with the objective to steal his money. Gouffé was a bailiff and process server at the jail, therefore rich and often having large amounts of money in his possession. Although he usually brought it home for safekeeping, Eyraud was familiar with his habits through mutual acquaintances and knew on Fridays he left the money at his office while he visited brothels. Thus, Eyraud and Bompard made their plan.

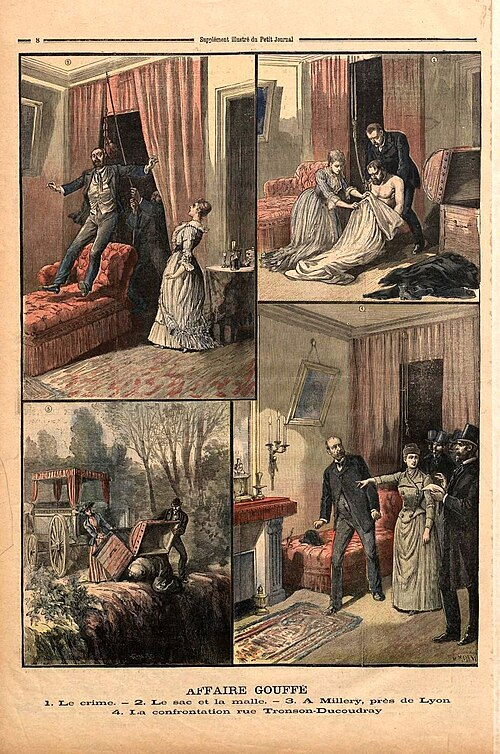
Illustration of the murder by Henri Meyer, published in Le Petit Parisien on 20 December 1890.

On July 24, 1889, Gabrielle Bompard moved into the ground floor apartment at No. 3 Rue Tronson-Ducoudray. The ground floor was attractive to the plan because it had no downstairs neighbors who could hear the murder or subsequent maneuvering of Gouffé’s body. The apartment had a convenient nook for Eyraud to conceal himself and a beam over top to set up the pulley system from which to drape the hangings that Eyraud and Bompard planned to use to strangle Gouffé. That same July, Eyraud and Bompard bought the silk hangings and a girdle for the strangling along with a large trunk in London.

On Friday morning, July 26, 1889, Bompard approached Gouffé, whom she had met through Eyraud, and they made plans to meet at 8pm at a nearby church. Bompard spent the day preparing for the murder, then went to dinner with Eyraud at 6pm. While Bompard went to meet Gouffé, Eyraud got into position at the apartment. Bompard and Gouffé walked together to the apartment, where she seduced him onto the couch, telling him she was no longer with Eyraud and claiming the robe she wore to be an admirer's gift. She climbed on top of Gouffé and placed her robe ties around his neck, discreetly connecting him to the pulley system above his head that hung from a ceiling beam. Eyraud, hiding behind the couch, yanked up and killed Gouffé.

They took his ring, watch, keys, and 150 francs before putting him into a bag that Bompard had sewn for this purpose. Then, Eyraud went to search Gouffé’s office for the rest of the cash but did not see the 14,000 francs (which were concealed by papers) and left empty-handed and distraught. He returned to the apartment and together they put the body bag into the large trunk. Bompard was left alone with it overnight. She later recalled fantasizing that night of seducing a random man on the street, shocking him with the body, and framing him for the murder. In the morning, Eyraud returned and they left together from Paris for Lyon.

At around 9pm on the night of the murder, the hallporter of the jail heard someone enter Gouffé’s office and leave. He originally thought it was Gouffé, but saw it was not when the man left, though the hallporter did not see his face. It was suspected theft, but the next morning nothing was missing from the office, although ten long, half burnt matches were found on the floor.

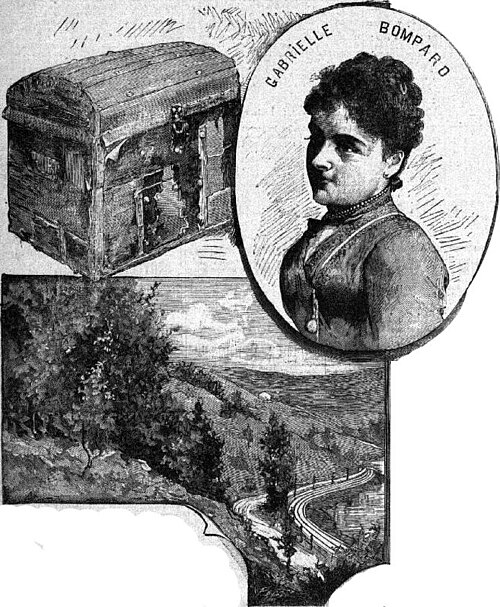
Engraving by Ernest Clair-Guyot in Le Petit Parisien, published 15 December 1889.

On August 15, 1889 on a road through the district of Millery, about ten miles from Lyon, the substantially decomposed body of Gouffé was found by a road-mender. On August 17, 1889, a broken trunk with a lock matching a key found near Gouffé’s body was discovered, with evidence of having been sent from Paris to Lyon on July 27, 1889.

In December 1889, Commissioner Marie-François Goron of the French Internal Security Service ("Service de la Sûreté") received a letter from someone who suspected that Bompard and Eyraud (both had warrants out for their arrest) had stayed in his house. It also informed him of Bompard's activities near the time of the murder, specifically that she had left for France on July 14 with a large and nearly empty trunk bought by Eyraud, arrived in London on the 17th, and was back in Paris by the 20th with Eyraud. On January 21, 1890, Goron received a long letter from Eyraud claiming he was innocent and his only fault was in associating with Bompard, who he also claimed was innocent.

On January 22, 1890, Bompard herself appeared in the office with a middle aged man. She was described as having dyed hair, grey-blue eyes, a large head, engaged expression, and short and strong body. She came in wearing all black, gave her name when asked, and requested to be interviewed by the prefect of the jail. Bompard, the man, and the prefect entered a private room, and Bompard told a version of the story in which she claimed to have been the unwilling accomplice of Eyraud. She claimed he had done it without her present at No. 3 Rue Tronson-Ducoudray and had then told her about it before the two of them left together for the United States where Eyraud was still on the run. She said they had encountered the man she was now with, and Eyraud had wanted to kill him too but she asked him to take her away, and the man suggested returning to France to give the police her story. Bompard and the man apparently thought explaining her version would be enough to dispel suspicion, but the warrant was still out for Bompard and Eyraud's arrest, and she was taken to prison. She was briefly depressed in prison but her spirits bounced back quickly. Eyraud was at that time evading arrest in Mexico and then Havana where the international news coverage of the case's developments made staying ahead of the hunt for him easy. During his time running he sent a letter to the French newspaper L’Intransigeant blaming Bompard and an unknown person for the murder. He was eventually brought to French police on June 16, 1890.

== Aftermath and Celebrity ==
=== Trial ===
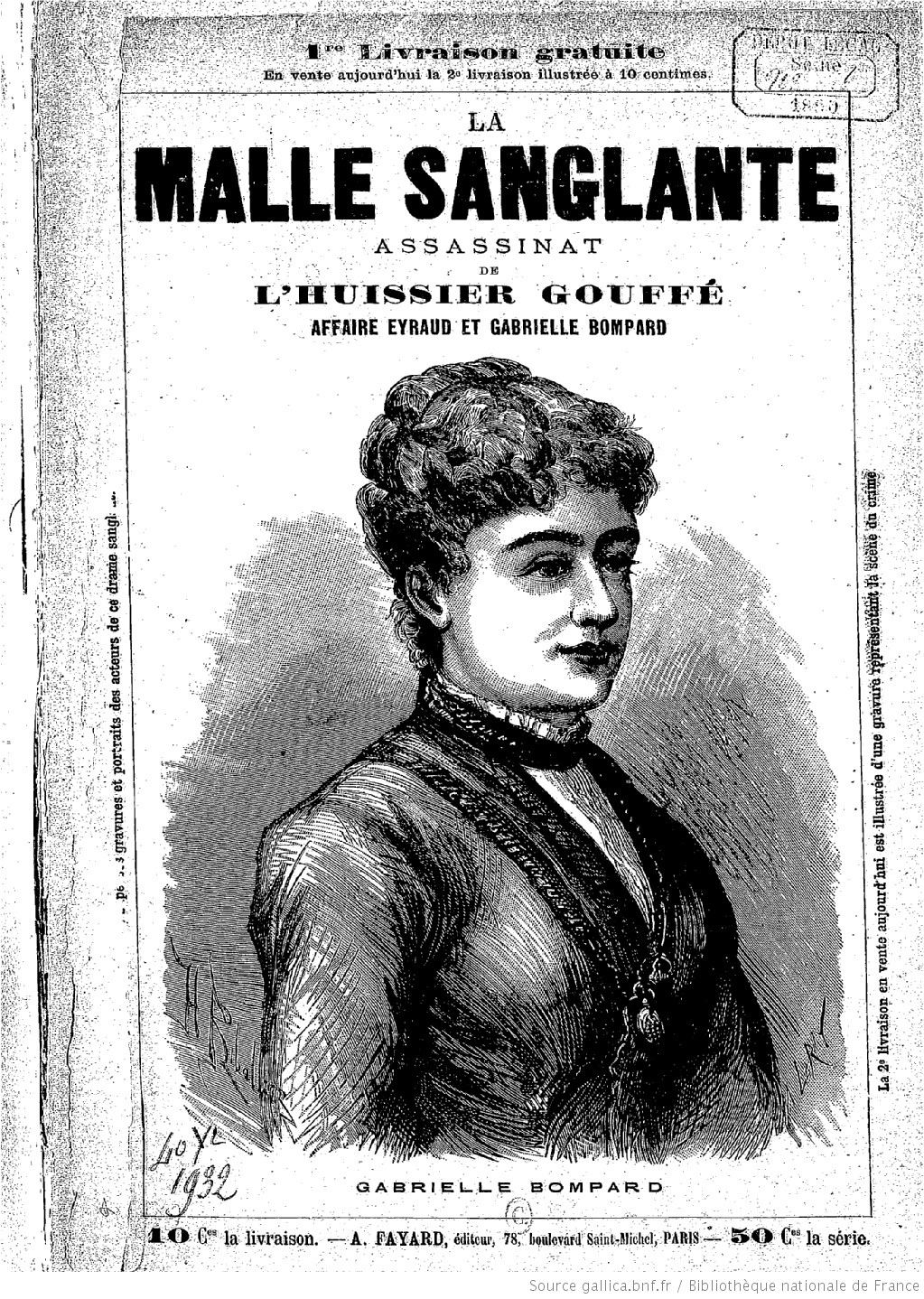
The cover of "The Bloody Trunk: the murder of bailiff Gouffé, the Eyraud case and Gabrielle Bompard" by Jules de Grandpré.

The trial lasted four days, starting December 16, 1890 in the Paris assized court. Eyraud initially approved of getting the guillotine as long as Bompard received the same verdict. But Bompard's lawyers claimed she had been hypnotized by Eyraud to make her participate in the murder. Jules Liégeois, a professor of law at University of Nancy, and a member of the Nancy School of Hypnosis, gave a four-hour lecture to the court on hypnosis in defense of Bompard, which was successful — despite other doctors assessing her in court and finding that she was easy to hypnotize but had likely not been in such a state during the murder. Bompard was sentenced to 20 years of hard labor in prison, while Eyraud was beheaded.

=== Hypnosis ===
Bompard's defense claimed she was under the influence of hypnosis by Eyraud that compelled her to help in the murder of Gouffé. Gilles de la Tourette, a neurologist, who, although not present at the court case, published an extensive account of the matter soon after (1891a, 189ib), was very interested in exploring hysterics as a sign of susceptibility to hypnosis. In the case of Bompard, however, he claimed no real murder could result from hypnosis, and that Bompard was faking it. Many doctors were brought onto the case. Some agreed with Tourette such as Paul Brouardel and Gilbert Ballet, and felt that Bompard was not ill in any way but simply lacking in reasoning abilities and moral character. Others, however, such as the prison doctor Jules Aristide Voisin (1844–1920), believed Bompard, and even hypnotized her in court as evidence. The hypnosis defense was possibly taken so seriously due to court drama; Bompard was a young, pretty woman who knew how to put on a show, and the idea of hypnotism fascinated both the public and politicians in the court. This is seen especially in the emphasis on her role in the murder as a seductress, and the "hypnotizing" affect of women's abilities on men.

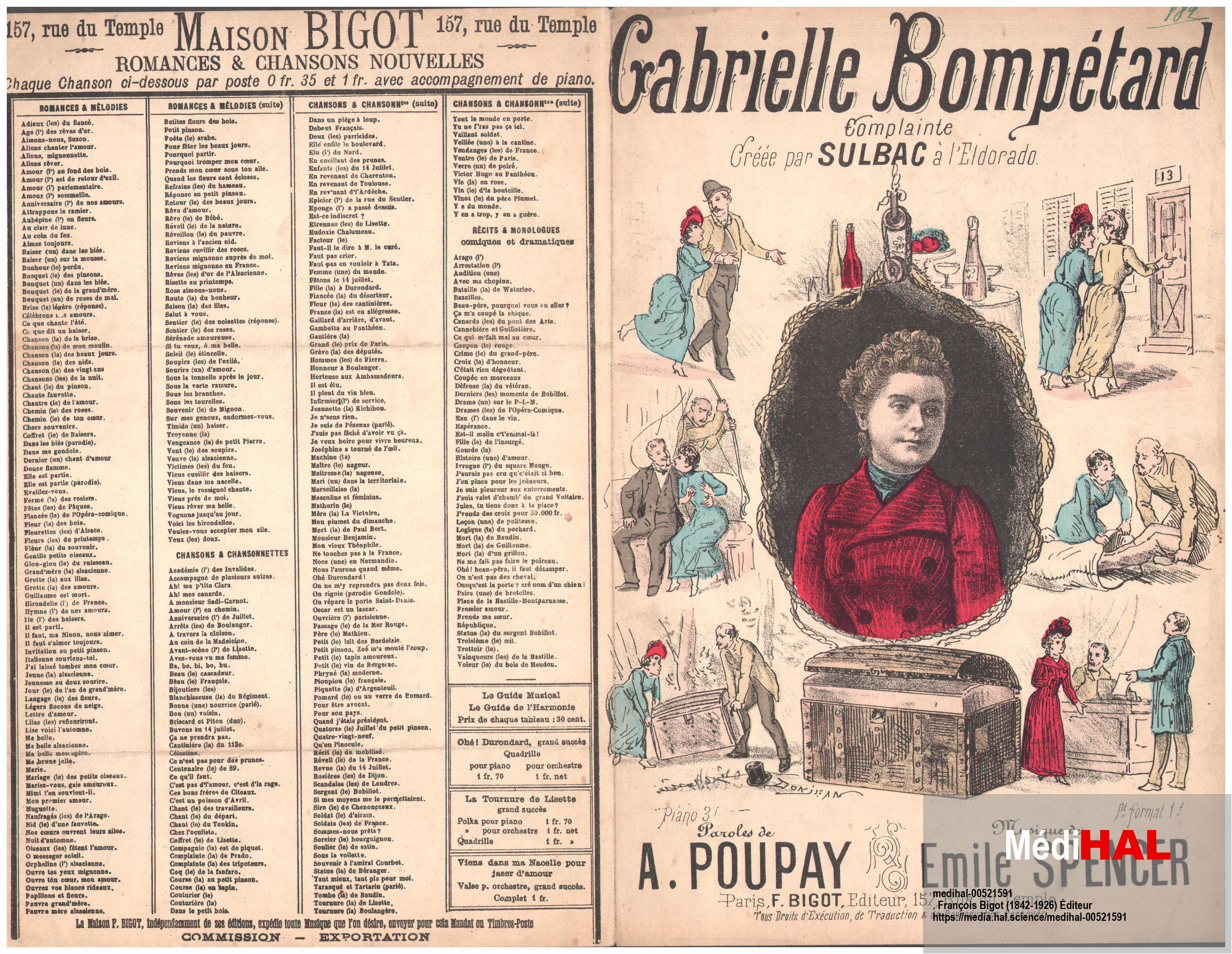
Coversheet of the song Gabrielle Bompétard: Lament inspired by the Gouffé case, 1890.

=== Legacy ===
Bombard's celebrity created sympathy for her situation among the public, inspiring works such as a song and book about her. Gabrielle Bompétard: Lament, the song, was inspired by the case and features Bompard on the scoresheet's cover. "The Bloody Trunk: the murder of bailiff Gouffé, the Eyraud case and Gabrielle Bompard" by Jules de Grandpré, is a book detailing the case that was published in 1890 in Paris: the peak of Bompard's fame. Bompard is illustrated alone on the cover, a rare aspect in the case's coverage which often features Bompard and Eyraud as a pair committing the murder, or depicts Gouffé. Little is known about Bompard's life after the Gouffé case or her death.

== See also ==
- Actus reus – In criminal law, the "guilty act"
- Agency (philosophy) – Capacity of an actor to act in a given environment
- Bonnie and Clyde – Bank robbers in the 1930s
- Causality – How one process influences another
- Criminology – Field of studies related to crimes
- Culpability – Degree to which one is morally or legally responsible for a crime
- Detective fiction – Subgenre of crime and mystery fiction
- Environmental criminology
- Forensic science – Application of science to law and investigation
- Gouffé Case – 1889 French murder case
- Hypnosis – State of increased suggestibility
- Ideomotor phenomenon – Concept in hypnosis and psychological research
- Jules Liégeois – French jurist, academic, and founding member of the Nancy School of Hypnosis
- Mens rea – In criminal law, the "guilty mind"
- The Nancy School of Hypnosis – French school of psychotherapy from 1866
- Posthypnotic amnesia – Inability in hypnotic subjects to recall events that took place while under hypnosis
- Probable cause – Legal concept in US law
- The Salpêtrière School of Hypnosis – French school of psychotherapy from 1882
- Somnambulism – Sleeping phenomenon combined with wakefulness
- Statistical correlations of criminal behaviour – Things associated with unlawful behavior
- Suggestibility – Inclination to accept the suggestions of others
- Suggestion – Psychological process of guiding a person
