= Georges Gilles de la Tourette =

French physician and the namesake of Tourette's syndrome (1857–1904)

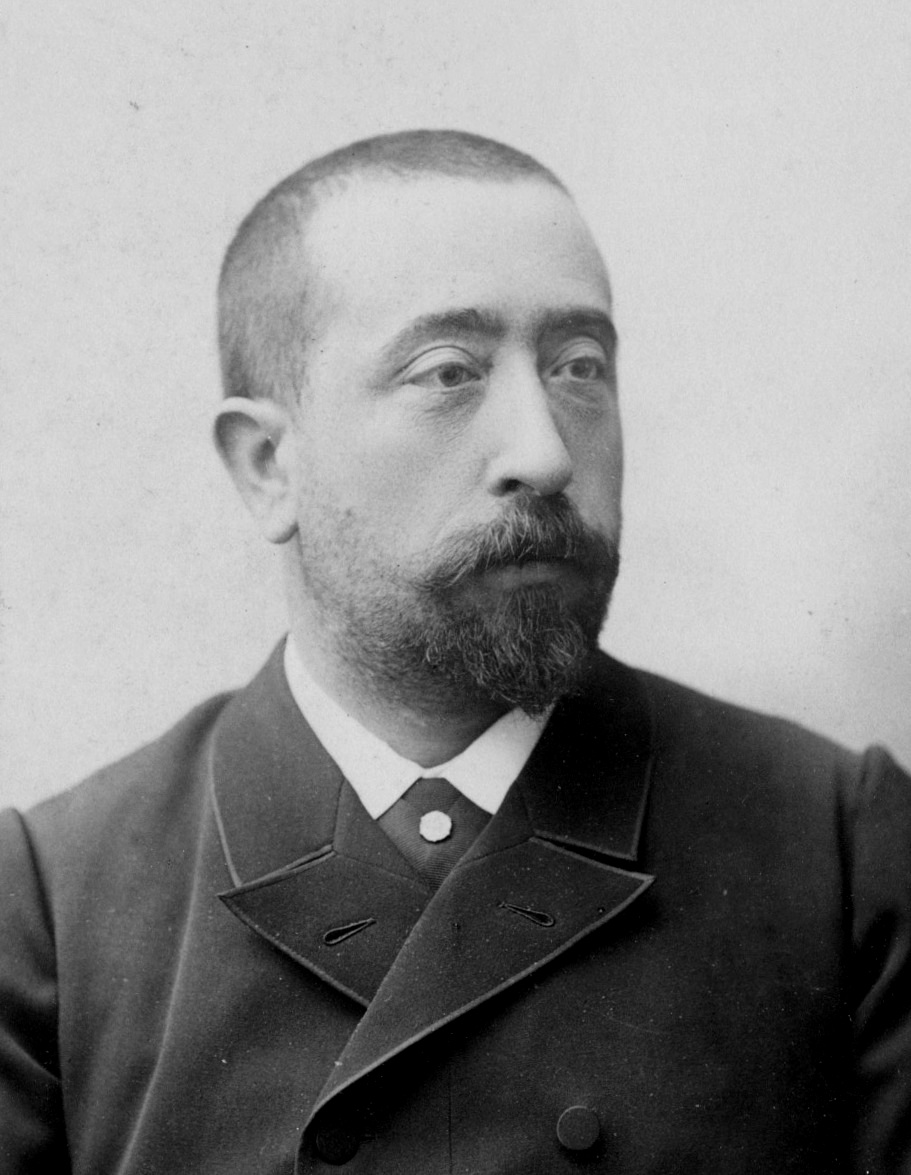
- Born: Georges Albert Édouard Brutus Gilles de la Tourette; 30 October 1857; Saint-Gervais-les-Trois-Clochers, Vienne, France
- Died: 22 May 1904 (aged 46); Lausanne, Vaud, Switzerland
- Citizenship: France
- Education: University of Poitiers, University of Paris
- Known for: Namesake of Tourette syndrome

Georges Albert Édouard Brutus Gilles de la Tourette (French: [ʒɔʁʒ albɛʁ edwaʁ bʁytys ʒil də la tuʁɛt]; 30 October 1857 – 22 May 1904) was a French neurologist and the eponym of Tourette syndrome, a neurodevelopmental disorder characterized by tics. His main contributions in medicine were in the fields of hypnotism and hysteria.

== Early life ==
Gilles de la Tourette was born the oldest of four children on 30 October 1857 in the small town of Saint-Gervais-les-Trois-Clochers in the district of Châtellerault, near the city of Loudun.

During 1873, Gilles de la Tourette began medical studies at Poitiers at the age of sixteen. In 1881, he relocated to Paris, where he continued his studies at the Laennec Hospital.

== Career ==
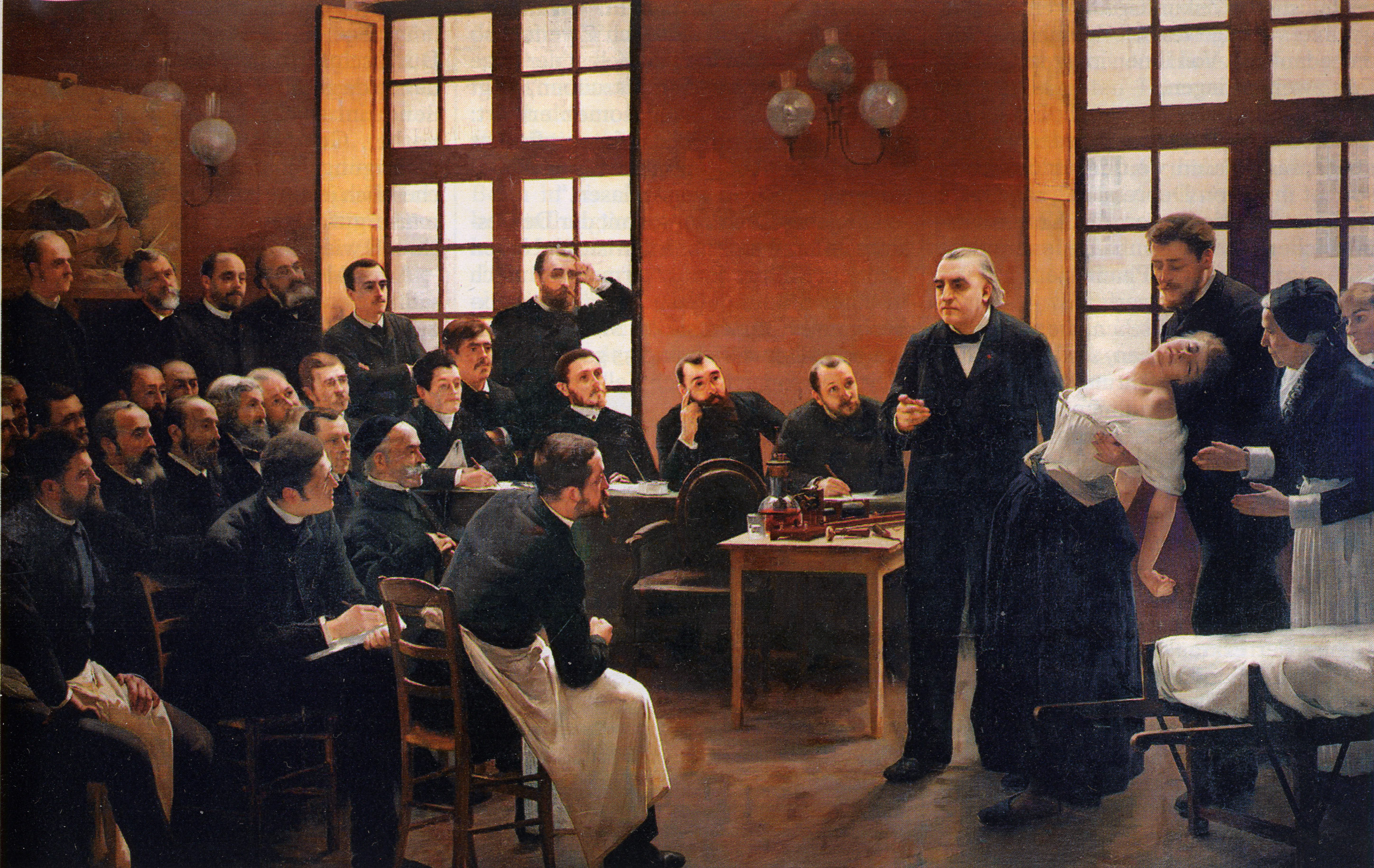
In A Clinical Lesson at the Salpêtrière (1887), French painter André Brouillet depicts a medical lecture with Jean-Martin Charcot and Gilles de la Tourette (seated at front)

Gilles de la Tourette began his internship in 1884, working "at a superhuman pace, publishing, teaching and practicing clinical medicine". He became a student, amanuensis, and house physician of his mentor, influential contemporary neurologist Jean-Martin Charcot, director of the Salpêtrière Hospital. Charcot also helped him to advance in his academic career. Gilles de la Tourette studied and lectured in psychotherapy, hysteria, and medical and legal ramifications of mesmerism (modern-day hypnosis). Colleagues and historians have described him as a "highly intelligent, if irascible, character".

In 1884, Charcot asked Gilles de la Tourette to work on motor disorders; latah, myriachit, and the Jumping Frenchmen of Maine had recently been described, and Gilles de la Tourette believed the conditions were related and separate from chorea. He described the symptoms of Tourette syndrome in one patient and collected previous observations of similar cases, and in 1885, he published a further nine cases using the name maladie des tics for the disorder. Charcot renamed the syndrome "Gilles de la Tourette's illness" in his honor, although the work was not well received at Salpêtrière.

Gilles de la Tourette published an article on hysteria in the German Army, which angered Bismarck, and a further article about unhygienic conditions in the floating hospitals on the river Thames. With Gabriel Legué, he analyzed 17th-century abbess Jeanne des Anges' account of her hysteria that was allegedly based on her unrequited love for a priest Urbain Grandier, who was later burned for witchcraft.

== Personal life and decline ==
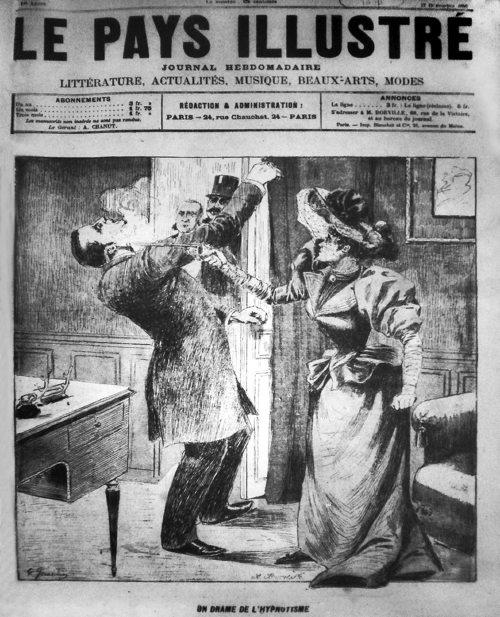
1893 depiction of the shooting of Gilles de la Tourette

Gilles de la Tourette married his cousin Marie Detrois (1867–1922) on 2 August 1887 in Loudon. Paul Brouardel and Charcot were witnesses. They had four children, three of whom lived to adulthood.

In 1893, Rose Kamper, a former patient at the Salpêtrière, who was later revealed to have psychosis, shot Gilles de la Tourette in the neck, (Note: Some older sources state that he was shot in the head; Walusinski (2019) describes the neck wound in detail.) claiming one of his colleagues had hypnotized her against her will. His mentor, Charcot, had died recently, and his young son had also died recently. Although he quickly recovered from the shooting and continued to work and organize lectures, after these events, Gilles de la Tourette began to display symptoms of severe depression. After 1893, his mental health noticeably declined.

In 1901, Charcot's son, Jean-Baptiste, convinced Gilles de la Tourette to travel to Switzerland on a ruse, and had him committed to a psychiatric hospital, where Gilles de la Tourette was diagnosed with tertiary syphilis. His condition worsened and he was forced to resign. His wife and colleagues were not forthcoming about the causes of his internment. He died on 22 May 1904 with advanced dementia at the Lausanne Psychiatric Hospital in Cery from what was labeled a status seizure, and that his wife described as apoplexy. Lees (2019) states that "Gilles de la Tourette died of general paralysis of the insane (neurosyphilis)".

== Writings ==
Gilles de la Tourette published sixteen papers on hysteria, including:

- Les actualités médicales, les états neurasthéniques (Paris 1898)
- Leçons de clinique thérapeutique sur les maladies du système nerveux (Paris 1898)
- L'hypnotisme et les états analogues au point de vue médico-légal (Paris, 1887; 2nd. edition Paris 1889)
- Les actualités médicales. Formes cliniques et traitement des myélites syphilitiques' convulsifs (La semaine médicale 1899)
- Traité clinique et thérapeutique de l'hystérie d'après l'enseignement de la Salpêtrière (Paris 1891)

== See also ==
- Gabrielle Bompard – Accused murderer in the 1889 Gouffé Case
- Gouffé Case – 1889 French murder case
- Jules Liégeois – French jurist, academic, and founding member of the Nancy School of Hypnosis
- The Nancy School of Hypnosis – French school of psychotherapy from 1866
- Posthypnotic amnesia – Inability in hypnotic subjects to recall events that took place while under hypnosis
- The Salpêtrière School of Hypnosis – French school of psychotherapy from 1882
