= Bompard =

Bompard may refer to:

== People with the surname ==
- Alexandre Bompard (born 1972), French businessman
- Frédéric Bompard (born 1962), French football player and manager
- Gabrielle Bompard, accused of murder in the Gouffé Case
- Henri Bompard (1821–1906), French industrialist and politician
- Jacques Bompard (born 1943), French politician
- Manuel Bompard (born 1986), French politician
- Maurice Bompard (politician) (1854–1935), French diplomat and later politician
- Maximin de Bompart (1698–1773), French naval officer of the eighteenth century

== Other ==
- Bompard, Marseille, part of the 7th arrondissement of Marseille, France
- Éric Bompard, French manufacturer of Cashmere clothing
- Trophée Eric Bompard, international, senior-level annual figure skating competition in Paris, France:
  - 2004 Trophée Eric Bompard
  - 2005 Trophée Eric Bompard
  - 2006 Trophée Eric Bompard
  - 2007 Trophée Eric Bompard
  - 2008 Trophée Eric Bompard
