= Paul Fromm =

Paul Fromm may refer to:

- Paul Fromm (philanthropist) (1906–1987), Jewish Chicago wine merchant and performing arts patron
- Paul Fromm (white supremacist) (born 1949), Canadian white supremacist
