= Hypnoanalysis =

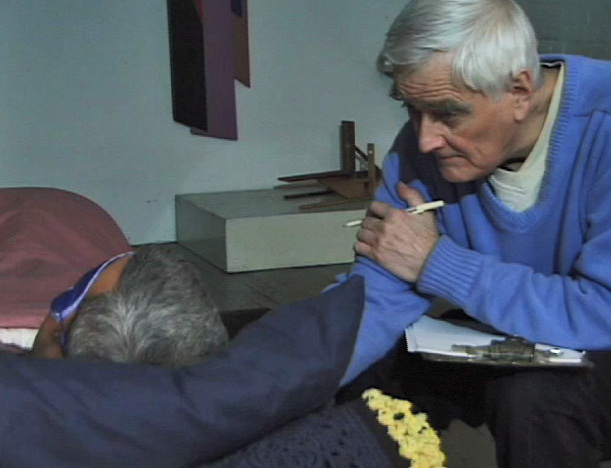
A hypnotic regression session, where the patient is relieving anxiety by experiencing memories without negative mentions being attached to them.

Hypnoanalysis is the technique of using hypnosis in the practice of psychoanalysis and psychotherapy. It attempts to utilize the trance state induced by hypnosis to effect a conscious understanding of a person's unconscious psychodynamics.

== History ==
Hypnoanalysis is derived from the prefix hypno, which the French Étienne Félix d'Henin de Cuvillers first used to describe the hypnotic state. The term hypnoanalysis was coined by James Arthur Hadfield, who claimed that he invented the term to describe the use of hypnosis to retrieve memories, particularly among patients who have amnesia. Other authors who contributed to its development include psychoanalyst Lewis Wolberg and German psychologist Erika Fromm. Fromm is particularly noted for her collaboration with Daniel Brown and Michael Nash, which produced their works detailing the benefits of hypnoanalysis in the 1980s and 1990s.

=== Freud ===
Hypnosis in the framework of psychotherapy was used by Freud and Breuer by 1985. Breuer discovered that hypnosis could be used, as a form of therapy, to help a hysterical patient to recall the events that caused their hysteria. Following from this, both Freud and Breuer laid down the fundamental ideologies for psychotherapy today, Cathartic Method and Mechanisms of Repression. Gruenewald (1982) commented on Freud's discoveries and stated that Freud recognised that hypnosis can be used as a way to revive memories whilst the patient is in a trance-like state. Freud's work on hypnosis assisted with his finding on the Principle of Transference. He discovered that during the process of hypnosis, there is an encounter between the past and present version of the individual undergoing hypnosis. Both Freud and Breuer carried out hypnosis treatments, by hypnotizing women, in order to have a better understanding of hypnoanalysis. However, due to the “libidinal” aspect of hypnosis, Freud's wife became jealous therefore, Freud discontinued his work on hypnoanalysis.

=== World War I ===
The term hypno-analysis was first used by Hadfield during World War I. Before WWI, hypnosis was mainly used to revive experiences that were either repressed or forgotten (Ambrose & Newbold, 1985). However, during WWI, hypnosis began to be used in other ways for example, for patients with amnesia due to war shocks (Hadfield, 1920; Brown, 1921). Hypnosis was a frequently used treatment during the time period of the War, as many people had traumatic war experiences, the army hospitals were under a significant amount of pressure so each patient needed to be treated quickly. Brown was the first to realise that during Hypnosis, patients usually had more than one traumatic event that caused their psyche to be weakened. This made psychologists realise that the human mind repressed traumatic memories from the consciousness to prevent hysteria. When Hypnosis was used alongside understanding past traumas, catharsis would be produced, this was useful during treatment. Erickson (1937) explained that for some patients when undergoing hypnosis, they can become unconscious whilst reliving experiences that were traumatic, In 1941, Kubie discovered that during hypnosis, it is possible to alter existing memories.

=== World War II ===
Erickson and Kubie (1941) used hypnosis as a cure for acute hysterical depression. The patient would firstly be hypnotised and given “protective suggestions” and in order to prevent guilt, the treatment would be followed up by posthypnotic amnesia. This became the procedure that future therapists began to follow. During World War II, the use of hypnosis as a treatment for war for neuroses became popular. In the neuropsychiatric clinic of the Army general hospital, Buckley (1950) noticed that 9 of 22 cases of head trauma with an “alteration of consciousness” were treated using hypnosis for a time period of 1 to 15 weeks and the treatments were successful. The use of hypnosis to cure war traumas was particularly effective as the treatment was short and the trauma took place recently during adulthood. Later on in 1949, Walkins put forward his “in-and-out” method. In order to help patients (with war shocks and traumas), Walkins would take the patient out of their hypnotic state 12-15 times within one session that lasts roughly an hour long. Walkins carried out this new method of hypnosis as it would help the patient integrate the unconscious and conscious mind.

== Use ==
Hypnosis is usually carried out with the help of a therapist using the technique of either mental images or verbal repetition. When undergoing hypnoanalysis, patients are usually more open to changes as they are put in a trance-like state of relaxation.

Hypnosis in modern-day is usually used to reduce a patient's stress and/or anxiety before they undergo procedures such as breast biopsy. Other conditions that use hypnosis as treatment include: pain control (pains such as cancer, childbirth, irritable bowel syndrome and fibromyalgia), changing unhealthy behaviors such as overeating, insomnia and smoking, hot flashes associated with menopause and can be used to ease the side effects for cancer treatments such as chemotherapy.

Hypnoanalysis is often used with the intention of uncovering repressed memories in therapy patients. It can be used for direct recall or in more indirect ways that involve other therapeutic approaches such as drawing and free writing. A technique used in hypnoanalysis called the "affect bridge" differs from treatment during regular psychoanalysis. Whereas psychoanalysis may use similar ideas to connect older events, an affect bridge helps the client remember an older memory by recalling other memories that have the same associated emotion. Some patients have reported that when they regress to a memory from much earlier in life, that they feel their body returns to its correct chronological age. This can cause them to feel young and small.

=== Risks ===
Hypnosis treatments can cause unwanted side effects, although rare, some patients experience adverse reactions to hypnosis either straight after the treatment or a few days later. Side effects when undergoing hypnosis therapy include: being anxious of the process when being induced, having trouble awakening from their dream-like state and possible time distortions. More general side effects for patients include: drowsiness, distress, headaches, dizziness and the creation of false memories. For patients with psychosis, clinical depression and hysterical disorders, using hypnosis as a form of therapy is not recommended as they may become agitated. Patients may fall asleep during treatments if they do not rest well beforehand.
