= Lewis Wolberg =

American psychoanalyst (1905–1988)

- Born: July 4, 1905; Odessa, Russian Empire
- Died: February 3, 1988 (aged 82); La Peñita de Jaltemba, Mexico
- Citizenship: United States
- Education: MD
- Alma mater: University of Rochester; Tufts University Medical School
- Spouse: Arlene Robbins
- Children: 2
- Scientific career
- Fields: Psychoanalysis, Psychiatry, Hypnoanalysis
- Workplaces: Postgraduate Center for Mental Health, New York City; New York University School of Medicine; Bellevue Hospitals

Lewis Robert Wolberg (July 4, 1905 – February 3, 1988) was an American psychoanalyst. He advocated the use of hypnoanalysis in psychiatric treatment. He wrote or edited 20 books, and in 1945 founded the Postgraduate Center for Mental Health in New York City.

In 1927, Wolberg graduated from the University of Rochester and obtained his M.D. from Tufts University School of Medicine in 1930. From 1967 to 1986, he was professor of psychiatry at the New York University School of Medicine.

Wolberg was also interested in dieting and nutrition. He authored The Psychology of Eating in 1936. He was highly critical of fad diets. To treat obesity, he recommended a low-calorie diet.

== Selected publications ==
- The Psychology of Eating (1936)
- Medical Hypnosis (two volumes, 1948)
- The Technique of Psychotherapy (1954)
- Hypnosis, is it for you? (1972)
- Handbook of Short-Term Psychotherapy (1980)
- The Practice of Psychotherapy: 506 Questions and Answers (1982)
- "Hypnoanalysis" 1945, 2nd. edition 1964

== See also ==
- Hypnotic Ego-Strengthening Procedure
