= Saint-Gervais-les-Trois-Clochers =

- Commune
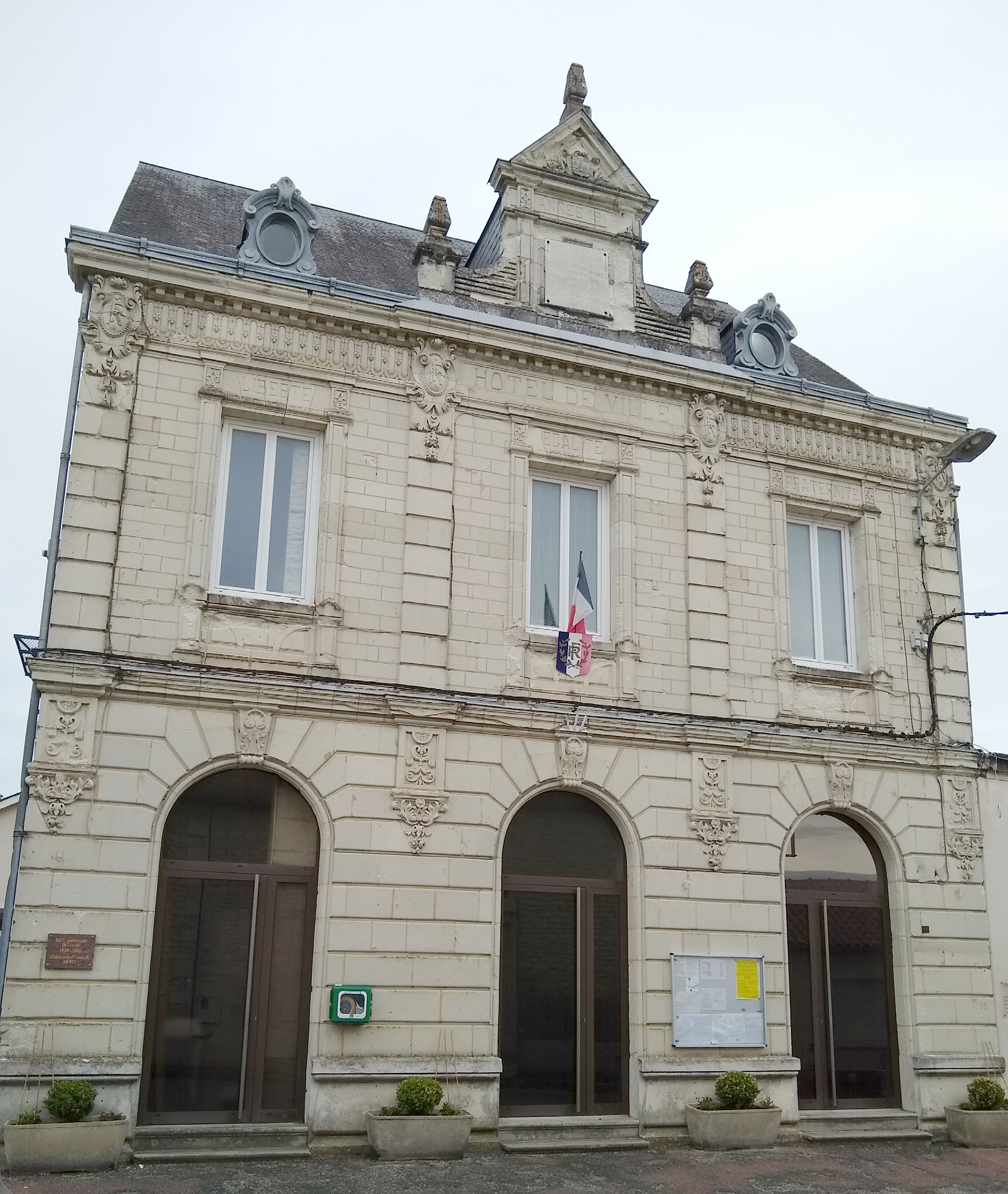
- Town hall

- Coat of arms
- Location of Saint-Gervais-les-Trois-Clochers
- Location within France Location within Nouvelle-Aquitaine
- Coordinates: 46°54′06″N 0°24′30″E
- Country: France
- Region: Nouvelle-Aquitaine
- Department: Vienne
- Arrondissement: Châtellerault
- Canton: Châtellerault-2
- Intercommunality: CA Grand Châtellerault

Government
  - Mayor (2020–2026): Antoine Braguier
- Area^{1}: 39.15 km^{2} (15.12 sq mi)
- Elevation: 152 m (499 ft)
- Highest elevation: 163 m (535 ft)
- Lowest elevation: 70 m (230 ft)
- Population (2023): 1,310
  - Density: 33.5/km^{2} (86.7/sq mi)
- Time zone: UTC+01:00 (CET)
  - Summer (DST): UTC+02:00 (CEST)
- INSEE/Postal code: 86224 /86230
- ^{1} French Land Register data, which excludes lakes, ponds, glaciers > 1 km^{2} (0.386 sq mi or 247 acres) and river estuaries.

Saint-Gervais-les-Trois-Clochers (French pronunciation: [sɛ̃ ʒɛʁvɛ le tʁwɑ klɔʃe]) is a commune in the Vienne department in the Nouvelle-Aquitaine region in western France.

== Demographics ==
Historical population
Year	Pop.	±% p.a.
1968	1,395	—
1975	1,290	−1.11%
1982	1,286	−0.04%
1990	1,187	−1.00%
1999	1,169	−0.17%
2007	1,323	+1.56%
2012	1,323	+0.00%
2017	1,314	−0.14%
2023	1,310	−0.05%
Source: INSEE

== Personalities ==
- Georges Gilles de la Tourette, neurologist

== See also ==
- Communes of the Vienne department
