= Postgraduate Center for Mental Health =

- Formation: 1945 (81 years ago)
- Founder: Lewis Wolberg
- Founded at: Upper East Side, Manhattan, New York City, New York, U.S.
- Type: Mental health services provider
- Headquarters: New York City, New York, U.S.
- Region served: New York City
- Website: pgcmh.org

The Postgraduate Center for Mental Health (PGCMH) is an American organization that provides mental healthcare services in New York City, New York.

It was founded in 1945 by psychiatrist Lewis Wolberg to provide psychological care to World War II veterans. Currently, it provides inpatient and outpatient clinical mental healthcare services, and also provides transitional and permanent housing for people with severe and persistent mental illnesses.

A 2016 audit of the organization carried out by the Office of the New York City Comptroller found several financial irregularities as well as health and safety violations in apartments managed by PGCMH.
