= Erika Fromm =

German-American psychologist (1909–2003)

- Born: Erika Oppenheimer; December 23, 1909; Frankfurt, German Empire
- Died: May 26, 2003 (aged 92); Chicago, Illinois, U.S.
- Education: University of Frankfurt
- Spouse: Paul Fromm
- Scientific career
- Fields: Hypnoanalysis, hypnotherapy
- Workplaces: University of Chicago
- Doctoral advisor: Max Wertheimer

Erika Fromm (née Oppenheimer, December 23, 1909 – May 26, 2003) was a German-American psychologist and co-founder of hypnoanalysis.

== Life ==
Erika Fromm was born Erika Oppenheimer in Frankfurt, the daughter of physician, Siegfried Oppenheimer, and Clementine Oppenheimer (née Stern) who died weeks after giving birth. She developed an early interest in psychoanalysis and the writings of Sigmund Freud. She decided on an academic career and graduated in 1933 with a PhD from the University of Frankfurt, where she studied with Max Wertheimer, the father of Gestalt theory.

In the following years she moved to the Netherlands to escape rising Nazism in Germany, and worked as a research associate and the director of a research laboratory. In 1936, she became engaged to Paul Fromm, a wine merchant, whom she later married; Paul was also a cousin of psychoanalyst Erich Fromm. In 1938, the couple emigrated to the United States. From 1939 to 1940, Fromm was a research assistant in the department of psychiatry at the University of Chicago. From 1943 to 1948, she launched a program for rehabilitation of war veterans. She joined the faculty of the university in 1961.

Fromm served as the editor of the International Journal of Clinical and Experimental Hypnosis and co-editor of The Bulletin of the British Society of Experimental and Clinical Hypnosis. From 1972 to 1973 she was president of the division of psychological hypnosis of the American Psychological Association. From 1971 to 1974 she was the president of the American Board of Psychological Hypnosis, and from 1975 to 1977 she was the president of the Society for Clinical and Experimental Hypnosis.

== Work ==
In her early works, Fromm questioned some of Sigmund Freud's discoveries and looked for ways to use hypnosis as a more effective method than psychoanalysis to help people, since she viewed psychoanalysis as rather a treatment for the wealthy. As she matured as a clinical physician, theorist, and researcher, she turned her attention to the nature of human intuition, creativity, dreams, and hypnosis. Erika Fromm studied hypnosis as a path to the unconscious, similar to Freud's dream analysis. When used correctly, hypnosis may be more effective and faster than psychoanalysis when working on problems. Psychoanalysis and hypnosis were previously characterized by mutual distrust, despite Freud's suggestion that the unconscious mind could be accessed through hypnosis.

Fromm campaigned against the American Psychoanalytic Association's stance that psychoanalysis required a medical degree and co-founded the Psychologists Interested in the Study of Psychoanalysis which evolved into APA's Division 39.

== Selected publications ==
- Erika Fromm & Ronald E. Shor (eds.) Hypnosis : developments in research and new perspectives . 2nd ed. New Brunswick: AldineTransaction, 2009. ISBN 978-0-20236-262-5
- Stephen Kahn & Erika Fromm (eds.) Changes in the therapist. Mahwah, N.J.: Lawrence Erlbaum, 2001. ISBN 978-0-80582-382-0
- Erika Fromm & Michael R. Nash (eds.) Contemporary hypnosis research. New York: Guilford Press, 1992. ISBN 978-0-89862-893-7
- Erika Fromm & Stephen Kahn. Self-hypnosis: the Chicago paradigm. New York: Guilford Press, 1990. ISBN 978-0-89862-341-3
- Daniel P. Brown & Erika Fromm. Hypnosis and behavioral medicine. Hillsdale, N.J.: L. Erlbaum Associates, 1987. ISBN 978-0-89859-925-1
- Daniel P. Brown & Erika Fromm. Hypnotherapy and hypnoanalysis. Hillsdale, N.J.: L. Erlbaum Associates, 1986. ISBN 978-0-89859-783-7
- Thomas M. French & Erika Fromm. Dream interpretation: a new approach. Madison, Conn.: International Universities Press, 1986. ISBN 0-82361-435-2
- Erika Fromm & Lenore Dumas Hartman. Intelligence, a dynamic approach. Garden City, N.Y.: Doubleday, 1955.
