= Paul Fromm (philanthropist) =

American businessman (1906–1987)

- Born: September 28, 1906; Kitzingen, Germany
- Died: July 4, 1987 (aged 80); Chicago, Illinois, U.S.
- Occupations: Wine merchant Arts patron
- Known for: Founder of the Fromm Music Foundation; Patron of contemporary classical music
- Spouse: Erika Fromm

Paul Fromm (September 28, 1906 – July 4, 1987) was a Jewish Chicago wine merchant and performing arts patron through the Fromm Music Foundation. The Organum for Paul Fromm was composed by John Harbison in his honor.

== Early life ==
Born in Kitzingen, Germany to a prominent family of vintners, Fromm was an early supporter of contemporary classical music in that country after he was exposed to Stravinsky's Rite of Spring in the early 1920s. He attended concerts at the Donaueschingen Festival further deepening his appreciation of the genre. A Jew, he was forced to flee Nazi Germany in 1938 and immigrated to the United States where he settled in Chicago where he co-founded a wine importing firm, the Geeting and Fromm Corporation in 1939 and then founded the Great Lakes Wine Company in 1943.

== Patronage ==
By 1952, his business was sufficiently well established to allow him to focus on establishing the Fromm Music Foundation, which financially supporting young composers through grants awarded on the recommendation of its staff of musicians and experts. Fromm's protégés include Benjamin Lees, Ben Weber and Elvin Epstein.

A "Paul Fromm Concert" of contemporary classical music is performed annually at the University of Chicago in his memory. The Paul Fromm Award is given annually by the Tanglewood Music Center in his name. During the period 1984-89, Earle Brown, then president of the Fromm Music Foundation, recommended many American composers for commissions including Daniel Asia, David Lang, William Susman, Henry Brant and Steve Reich.

Paul Fromm was married to University of Chicago psychology professor and writer Erika Fromm whom he met in Germany in 1936 and married in 1938 shortly before emigrating to the United States.

Fromm's 1966 article "A Contemporary Role for American Music Libraries" inspired the major compendium of Boston-area composers and compositions called the Boston Composers Project.

== See also ==
- 20th-century classical music
