= Gouffé Case =

1889 French murder case

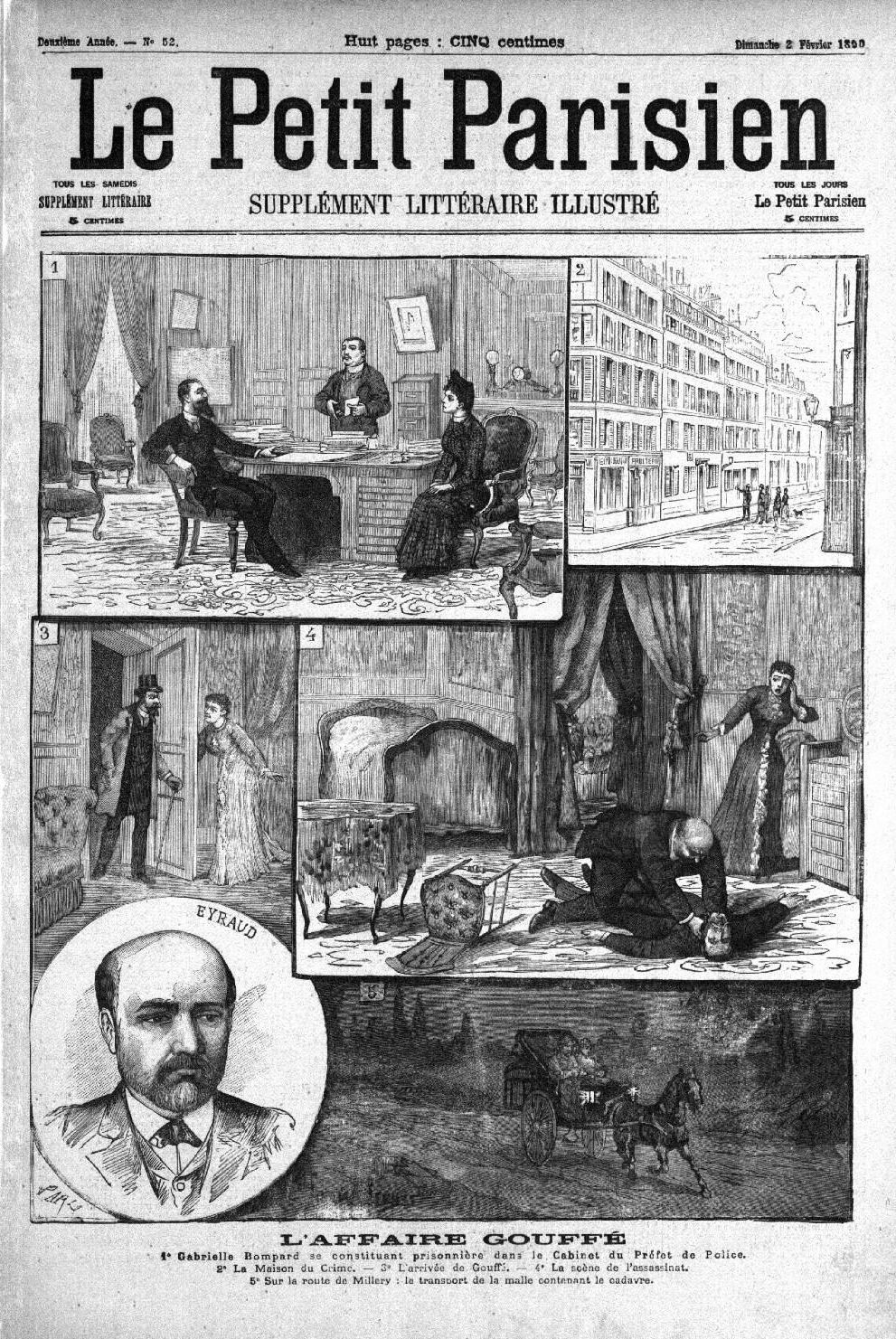
« The Gouffé Case ». The page in Illustrated literary supplement Petit Parisien, 2 February 1890.

The Gouffé Case, also known as the Gouffé trunk, Miller's bloody trunk or the Eyraud-Bompard affair, was an 1889 murder case which unfolded in France. On 26 July 1889, bailiff Toussaint-Augustin Gouffé of Montmartre, Paris, was reported missing. Two weeks later, Gouffé's corpse was found 300 miles (480 km) away, near Millery village, a suburb of Lyon. The case marked a milestone in the use of forensic pathology and forensic science in criminal investigations, and the trial of Gouffé's accused killers, Michel Eyraud and Gabrielle Bompard, captured the attention of the French press.

== Details of the case ==
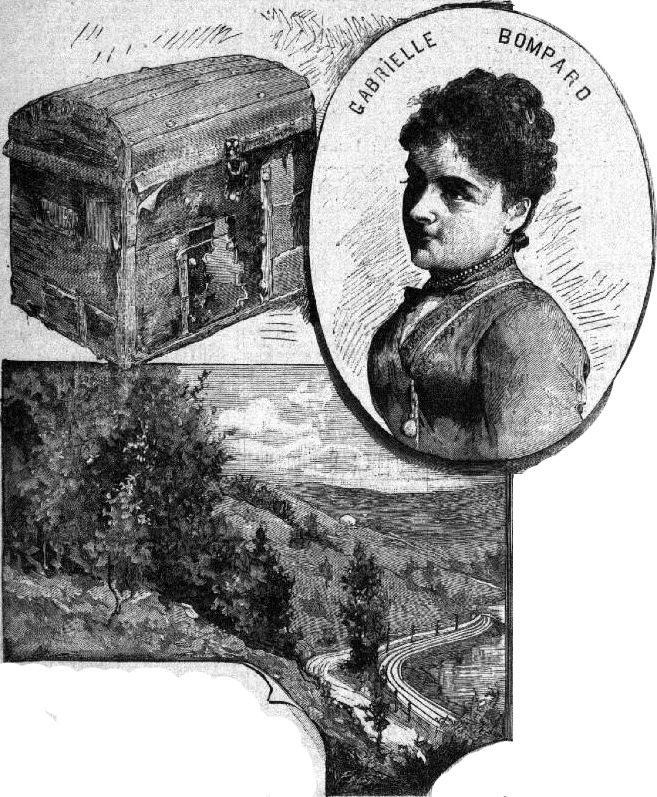
The Gouffé Case. The trunk in which the body was transported. - View of Millery - Gabrielle Bompard, Eyraud's lover, and suspected murderer. Engraving by Ernest Clair-Guyot. Illustration in Illustrated literary supplement, Le Petit Parisien, 15 December 1889.

On 13 August 1889, roadmender Denis Coffy on investigating a complaint of a bad smell on a minor road in Vernaison, Millery, a suburb of Lyon, found a large oilskin bag under a bush. Inside was a human body, which the local authorities took in for forensic investigation – a novel practice for the time.

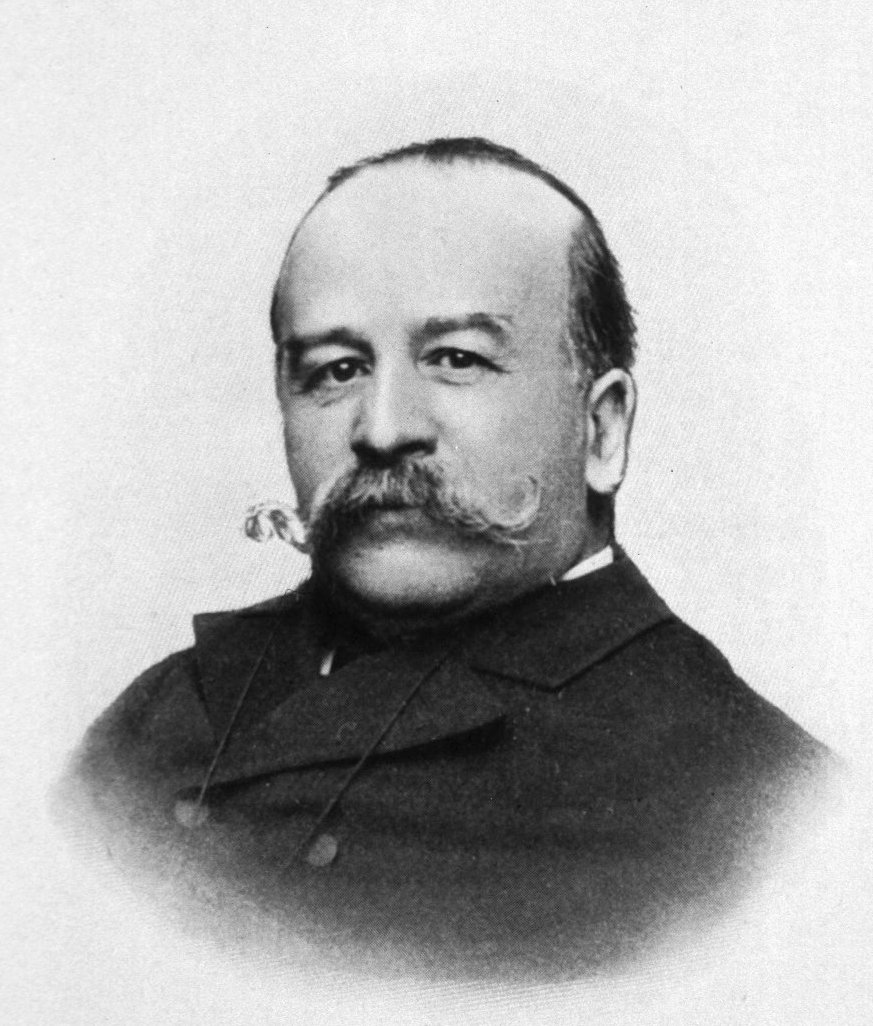
Doctor Alexandre Lacassagne

A forensic surgeon, Paul Bernard, undertook an autopsy on 14 August. He reported that the naked body was bound with seven meters of rope; that the head was enveloped in a black oilskin cloth and that the victim had died by strangulation three to five weeks previously. Three months later, on 13 November 1889, the body was again examined by doctor Alexandre Lacassagne in a procedure which lasted a week. The body was identified as that of Toussaint-Augustin Gouffé based on a sample of hair taken from Gouffé's comb – also a novel practice at the time – and the description of an old back injury in his missing person's report. Gouffé, a 49-year-old court bailiff, had kept a study at 148 Montmartre, Paris. He was described as a respectable widower with two daughters, but was also said to be somewhat of a womaniser.

Two days after the discovery of Gouffé's body, another abandoned trunk, noticed by a trader in snails, was found in Saint-Genis-Laval. The key fitted in the lock, a missing nail was similar to a nail found in Millery, and the stench from the chest left no doubt about its prior usage. A tag glued to one of the boards suggested that the trunk had been brought from Paris to Lyon by rail, on 27 July 1888 or 1889 (the last figure being unreadable). The registers of the railway company Chemins de fer de Paris à Lyon et à la Méditerranée (PLM) confirmed that 1889 was the precise year; this date also corresponded with Gouffé's disappearance. The prosecutor of Lyon alerted the ministère public in Paris, which in turn entrusted the inquiry to Commissioner Marie-François Goron of the French Internal Security Service ("Service de la Sûreté"). Inspectors explored Gouffé's habits and relationships, and realized that he had frequently socialized with a couple of swindlers, Michel Eyraud and his mistress Gabrielle Bompard, just prior to his disappearance. Eyraud and Bompard had hurriedly left Paris on 27 July 1889, two days before Gouffé was reported missing by his brother-in-law. On 29 November, one of the first Interpol notices was sent out in the search for Eyraud and Bompard. Suspicion against the two was further confirmed when a carpenter in London identified the trunk, which the couple had purchased from him during a trip to London.

== Investigation ==
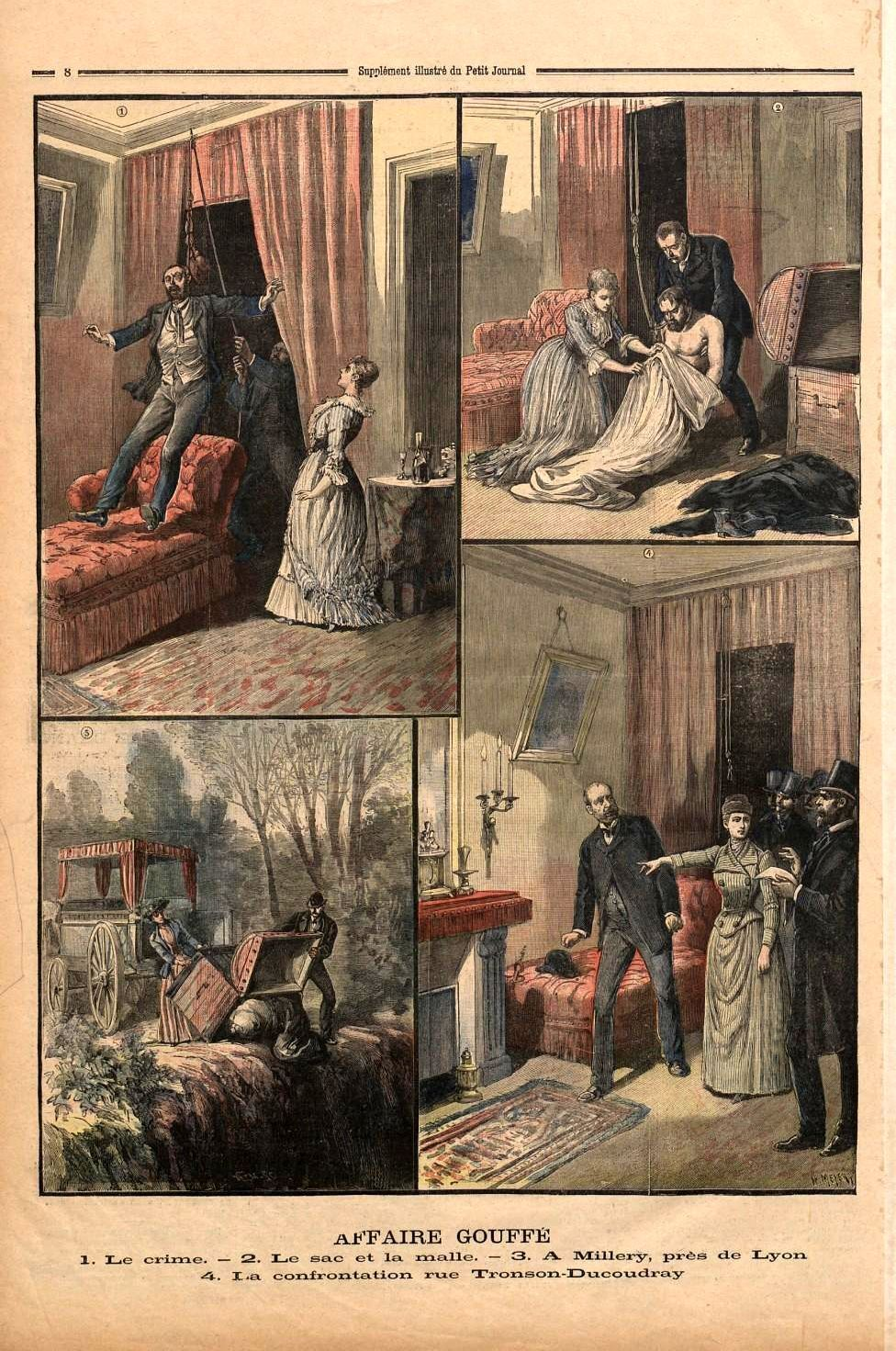
«The Gouffé Affaire». Picture by Henri Meyer. Illustrated literary supplement, Le Petit Parisien, 20 December 1890.

On 26 July, Bompard pretended to accidentally meet Gouffé in a Parisian cafe and encouraged him to visit her at a flat, located on Tronson-du-Coudray street in the 8th arrondissement, which she rented with Eyraud. There, having flirtatiously invited Gouffé to sit down on a deckchair, she wound around his neck the cord of a dressing gown. Eyraud, who hid behind a curtain, caught the cord and garroted Gouffé. When the victim resisted, Eyraud, thrown into a panic, sprang out of the hiding-place and strangled him with his hands. During the interrogation, Eyraud claimed that it was Bompard who strangled Gouffé.

Having been unable to extract money from Gouffé before his murder, Eyraud and Bompard tried to get rid of the body. They put him in the trunk they had purchased in London and sent the trunk to Lyon via the PLM. At Lyon railway station they recovered the bulky luggage and rented an automobile to transport it. When the 105 kg trunk became too heavy for them and the smell of putrefaction became overwhelming, they left it on the road of Millery. The couple then left for the United States.

== The perpetrators ==
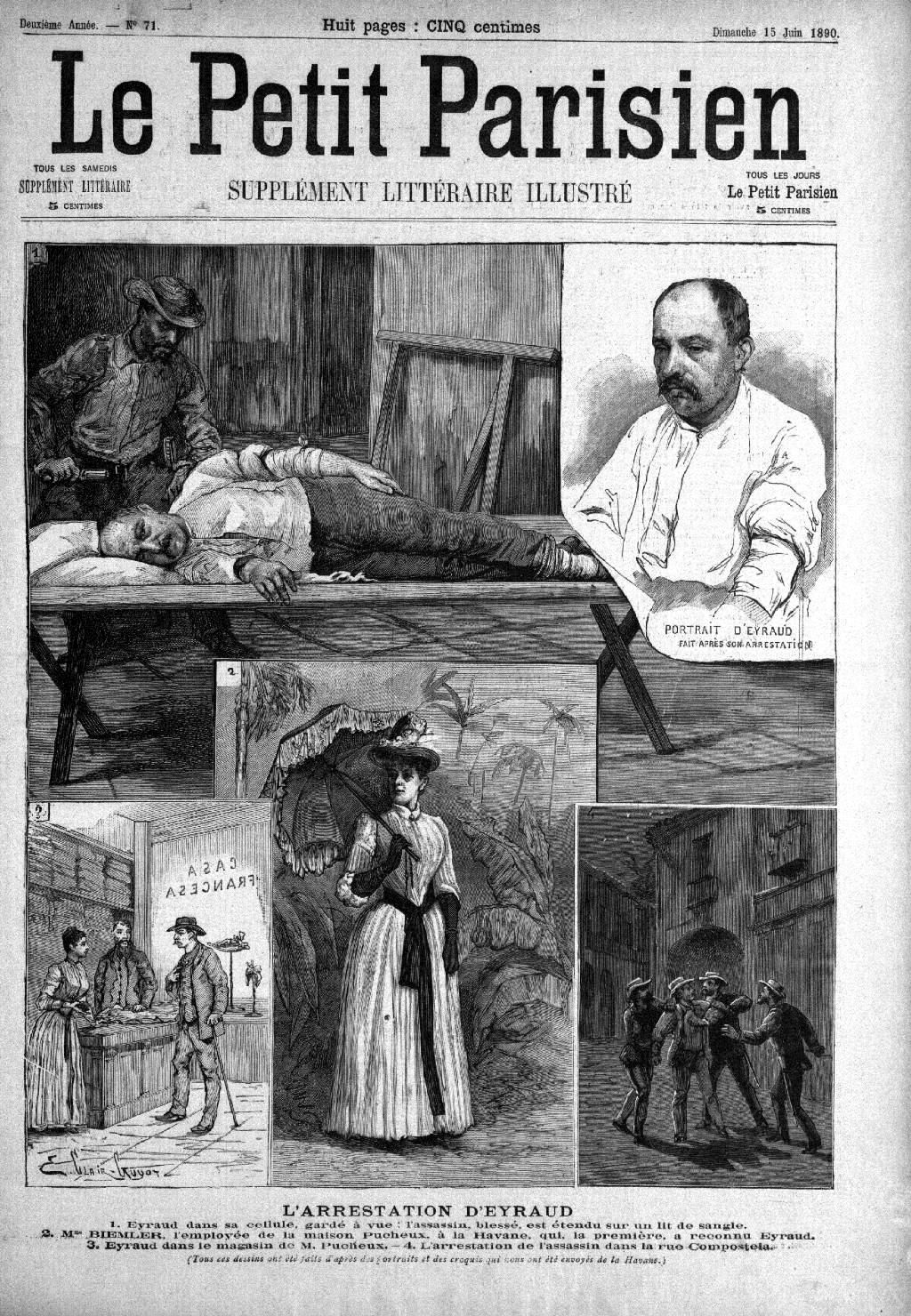
« Arrest of Eyraud ». Engraving by Ernest Clair-Guyot. Illustrated literary supplement in Petit Parisien, 15 July 1890.

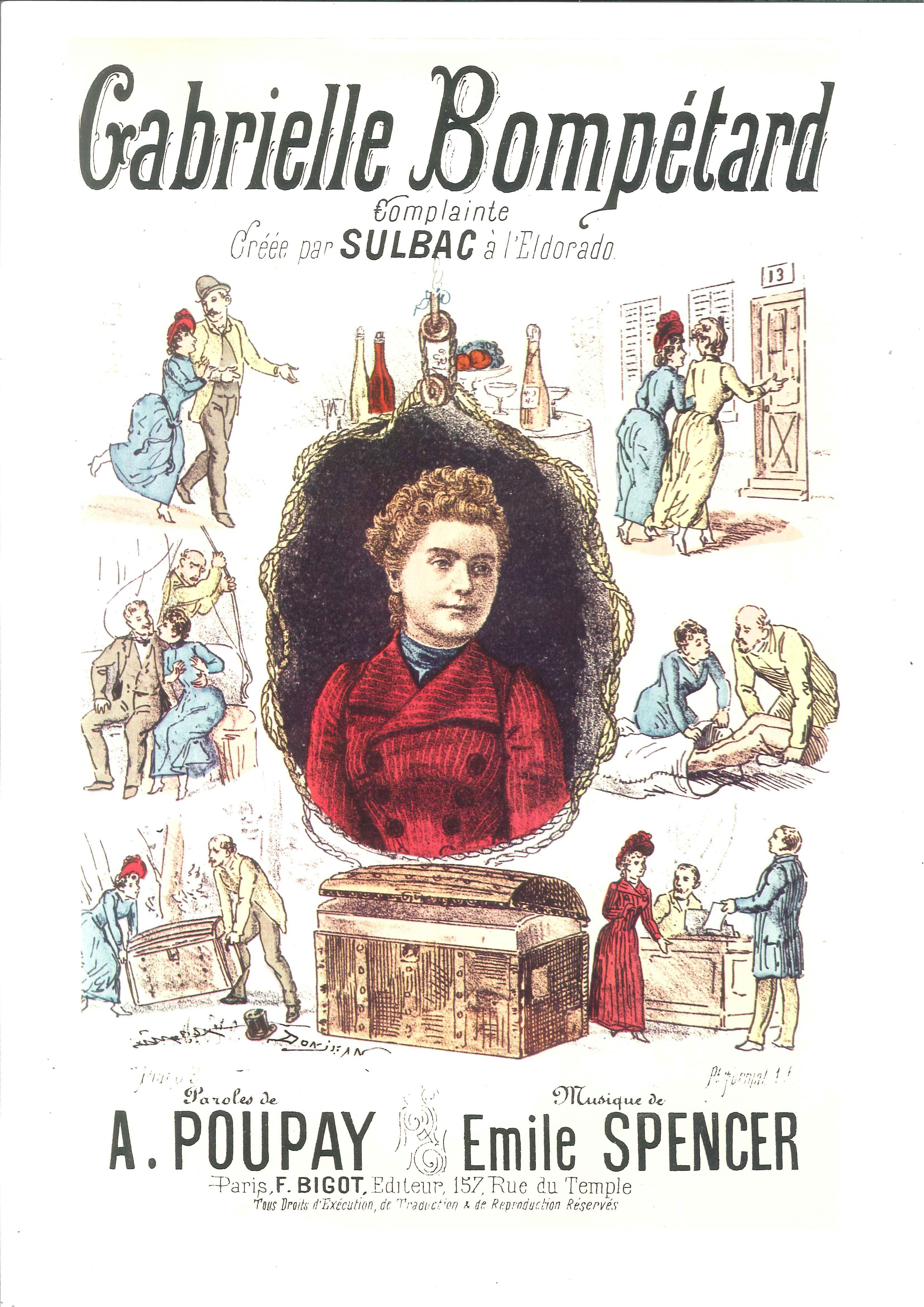
Gabrielle Bompétard. Lament created by Sulbac at the Eldorado theatre, 1890. Cover of the scoresheet of a song inspired by the case.

Michel Eyraud was born in Saint-Étienne on 30 March 1843, the son of merchants. He married a 19-year-old girl on March 17, 1870, but after proving himself a violent, fickle husband he soon left his wife to take up a career of "adventure". In 1863 he enlisted in the French Army and gained the rank of corporal of Jägers during the Maximilian Affair. After leaving the military Eyraud engaged in various criminal activities, including fraud.

Gabrielle Bompard was born in 1868 in northern France. The daughter of a metal dealer, Bompard was described as having a nice but rather confusing character, possibly due to having been spoilt by her widowed father. In spite of her youth, she had nevertheless already gained a reputation for debauchery.

== Arrest and trial ==
Bompard left Eyraud in San Francisco and returned to France, where she was imprisoned on 22 January 1890. First she disclaimed any participation in Gouffé's murder, but she ended up cracking and started to tell everything in detail. Meanwhile, Eyraud continued his living by engaging in fraudulent activities between the US, Canada and Mexico. In June 1890, having avoided French policemen on several occasions, he was finally arrested in Havana.

Both criminals stood trial in December 1890. Although defended by the famous lawyer Félix Decori, Eyraud was sentenced to death. He was guillotined in Paris on 3 February 1891, by the executioner Louis Deibler.

Mister Henry-Robert, Bompard's lawyer, alleged that his client had been subjected by Eyraud by means of hypnosis, a very popular practice of the period and was thus his involuntary accomplice. Because of extenuating circumstances, Bompard was given a comparatively lenient sentence of twenty years of hard labour, which were spent in the female prison of Nanterre and in Clermont jail in Oise. She was freed in 1905 before the expiry of her prison term, having benefited from several reductions of penalty for good conduct. Bompard continued her occupation of dance. Her past inspired the public for the lament Gabrielle Bompard. Bompard died in obscurity in the early 1920s.

== Literature ==
Commissioner Marie-François Goron retired in 1933 after forty-eight years of service, and his memoirs became a precursor for the work of Detective and criminalist François Vidocq. During sixteen years, the public was roused with twenty-one books about braggart policeman, one of which narrated about the Gouffé Case.

== Bibliography ==
- Eyraud and Bompard
- Bataille «Causes Criminelles et Mondaines» 1890.
- L’Affaire Gouffe by Dr. Lacassagne, Lyons, 1891.
- Goron «L’Amour Criminel»
- Bogousslavsky, Julien & Walusinski, Olivier (2010), "Gilles de la Tourette's criminal women: The many faces of fin de siècle hypnotism", Clinical Neurology and Neurosurgery, Vol.112, No.7, (September 2010), pp. 549–551. doi:10.1016/j.clineuro.2010.03.008 PMID 20413214
- Brodie-Innes, John William (1891), "Legal Aspects of Hypnotism", Vol.3, No.1, (January 1891), pp. 51-62.
- Harris, Ruth (1985), "Murder under hypnosis", Psychological Medicine, Vol.15, No.3, (August 1985), pp. 477–505. doi:10.1017/S0033291700031366
- Irving, H.B. (1918), "Partnership in Crime: Eyraud and Bompard", pp. 397—407 in H.B. Irving, A Book of Remarkable Criminals, London: Cassell and Company.
- Plas, Régine (1998), "Hysteria, Hypnosis, and Moral Sense in French 19th-Century Forensic Psychiatry: The Eyraud-Bompard Case", International Journal of Law and Psychiatry, Vol.21, No.4, (Autumn 1998), pp. 397–407. doi:10.1016/S0160-2527(98)00024-7
