= Marie-François Goron =

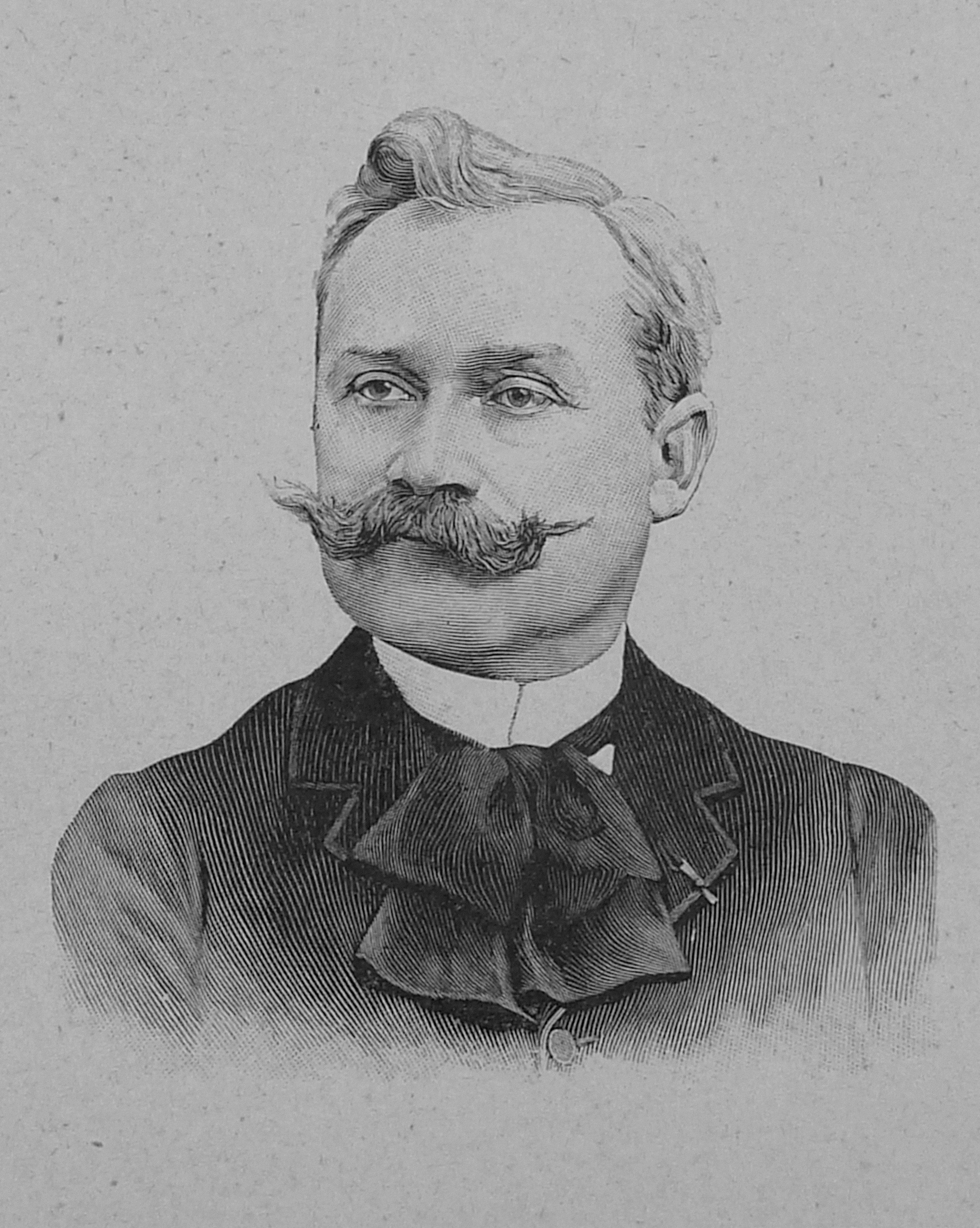
- Portrait gravé pour l’Album Mariani, tome VII, 1902.
- Born: 2 March 1847; Rennes
- Died: 4 February 1933; Sannois
- Occupations: Civil servant, writer, police officer
- Awards: Chevalier of the Legion of Honour; Officer of the Legion of Honor; Honour medal for courage and devotion (1878)

Signature
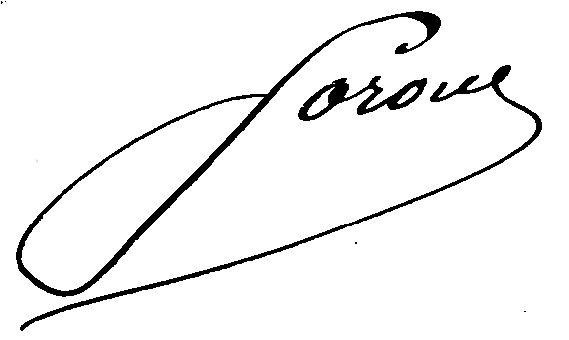

Marie-François Goron (2 March 1847 — 4 February 1933), was a French police official and best-selling author. A number of developments in the French police force took place under his direction.

After joining the army between 1865 and 1875, he then rapidly rose through the ranks of the French police, becoming Chief of the Service de la Sûreté, the French criminal spy police, in 1887. Goron held this position for seven years, until 1894.

While at the head of the Sûreté and as the first occupant of 36, quai des Orfèvres, Goron was a key figure in a series of judicial and political affairs. For instance, he was responsible for the arrest of Clément Duval and Vittorio Pini, considered foundational figures of illegalism. He also solved his most renowned case, the Gouffé Case, where his relentless investigation led to its resolution. A few years later, he played a central role and was a significant witness in the Clichy Affair, followed by the Ère des attentats (1892–1894), during which he was tasked with stopping anarchist bombings. Notably, he arrested Jean-Pierre François.

Following accusations of corruption, Goron was demoted and subsequently left his position to open a private firm in 1895. He then transitioned into a successful career as an author, publishing numerous works. His Memoirs, released in four volumes in 1897, serve as a significant, albeit biased, source of information about the period.

== Biography ==
=== Youth and education ===
Marie-François Goron was born in Rennes on 2 March 1847. He was a 'bad' student and only completed his schooling up to the equivalent of the tenth grade.

=== Military career ===
At eighteen, in 1865, Goron joined the army. He participated in colonial campaigns in Martinique and Algeria, and also in the Franco-Prussian War. He served as a corporal in the 99th Infantry Regiment, then as a non-commissioned officer in several other regiments, including the 1st Regiment of Senegalese Tirailleurs. By 1875, he was a lieutenant, and later became a reserve captain.

=== Commercial and colonial endeavours ===
For several years, he worked as a commercial employee in Rennes. He then moved with his wife and two children to Argentina, specifically to the Formosa colony in the Gran Chaco region. However, after two very difficult years, he decided to return to France.

=== Police ===
In 1881, Goron joined the Paris Police Prefecture, thanks to recommendations from Rennes deputies to Prefect Andrieux. By 1882, he became secretary of the Saint-Vincent-de-Paul district police station in Paris. His career quickly advanced; he was appointed commissaire in Pantin on 12 November 1885.

==== Sûreté ====
In September 1886, Goron became the deputy chief to his predecessor, Ernest Taylor, at the Sûreté, and then its head. Upon taking charge, he oversaw the relocation of the Sûreté to 36, quai des Orfèvres, becoming its very first occupant.

Just a few months into his new role, Goron faced the Duval affair, which involved Clément Duval, a key figure in the illegalist tendency of anarchism. When Goron's team went to arrest Duval at his home, Duval fled. He was eventually apprehended by Brigadier Rossignol, whom he seriously injured, and then placed under arrest. Goron met with Duval, and the two conversed; he also attended Duval's trial. Through this trial, Goron, much like a significant portion of the French public, became acquainted with anarchism. Later, in his Memoirs, Goron would argue that Duval was the primary inspiration behind the Ère des attentats (1892–1894) and the first real application of propaganda by the deed. According to Goron, this concept had previously remained theoretical or limited to minor attacks, such as the Thiers statue bombing.

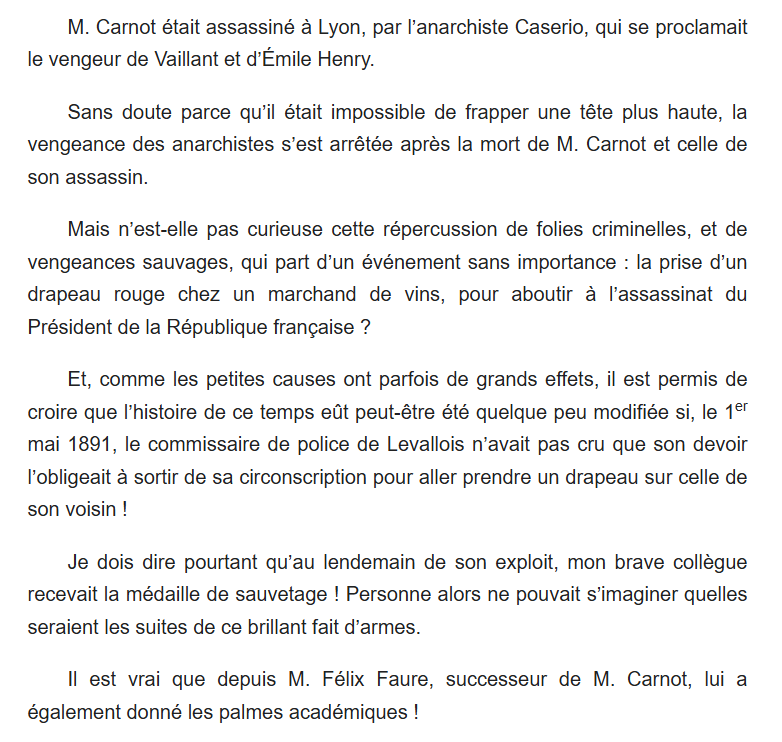
Marie-François Goron criticizing his colleague, the commissaire of Levallois-Perret, for his role during the Clichy affair

In 1888, Goron was involved in the arrest of Vittorio Pini, another founder of illegalism, much like Duval. In the same year, Goron solved the Gouffé Case, his most famous investigation, after heavily committing to the inquiry and refusing to give up on it. Despite numerous difficulties, the Sûreté managed to find the culprit and the motive behind the crime. He was awarded the Légion d'Honneur in November 1889.

In 1890, Goron played a notable role in the Clichy Affair, a case of police brutality. In this incident, the police commissaire of Levallois-Perret decided to intervene in his colleague's jurisdiction to seize a rolled-up red flag that anarchists were carrying into a bar. The anarchists were severely beaten and left without medical attention. Goron was called to the scene, observed the injured anarchists' condition, and took the three victims—Henri Decamps, Charles Dardare, and Louis Lévéillé—with him. Decamps, believing Goron to be the police prefect and believing he was a witness of the violence, cited him as a witness for the defense.

According to his own testimony, he then intervened at the trial of the accused to state that he did not know if the police had beaten the anarchists on site or at the police station; but that he confirmed that several hours after the events, when he arrived on site, the anarchists were left for dead. In the account he gives of these events, Goron is very critical of the role of the police commissaire of Levallois-Perret, who was responsible for the affair by choosing to go to his neighbor's district in Clichy to commit an illegal act. According to him, without realizing it, this commissaire was responsible for the Ère des attentats and the assassination of Sadi Carnot.

During this period, Goron, like the rest of the French police, was tasked with trying to stop the anarchist bombings. He frequently visited the sites of these attacks, even though this wasn't technically part of his duties, as his department was theoretically responsible for non-political crime. He nonetheless arrested members of the Pieds-plats group involved in the Véry bombing, such as Jean-Pierre François and Fernand Bricout.

Looking back on these events several years later, Goron argued that repression and exceptional laws were ineffective ways to combat anarchists. He supported the abolition of the death penalty, being careful not to create new martyrs. He also mentioned his own experiences with raids, stating that "all the anarchist hunts I have witnessed have had the most pitiable results".

=== Retirement and writings ===
In 1894, Goron was demoted to a simple commissaire, likely due to corruption allegations where he was accused of using departmental funds for personal expenses.

Granted retirement in 1895, he opened a private detective agency under his own name, becoming a notable example of a police officer transitioning to the private sector. He also began writing his memoirs, achieving considerable success, and later ventured into writing detective novels. In 1914, at the outbreak of war, he volunteered for service and was assigned to the Deuxième Bureau (French military intelligence).

== Works ==
Les mémoires de M. Goron (1897), including, on anarchism and anarchists:

- L'anarchiste Duval, discussing illegalism, Clément Duval and other related subjects
- La police et les anarchistes, discussing Vittorio Pini, the Clichy Affair and start of the Ère des attentats
- Les assassins anarchistes, discussing his opinion on 'anarchist assassins', a particular type of anarchist that would exist, according to him
- Les faux-monnayeurs et l'anarchie, discussing illegalist and more broadly anarchist methods to organize
- La répression de l'anarchie, arguing that repression is not the good way to deal with anarchists

== Bibliography ==
- Bienvenue, Clovis (2012). Le 36, quai des Orfèvres. Presses Universitaires de France (PUF).
