= Millery, Rhône =

Millery
- Commune
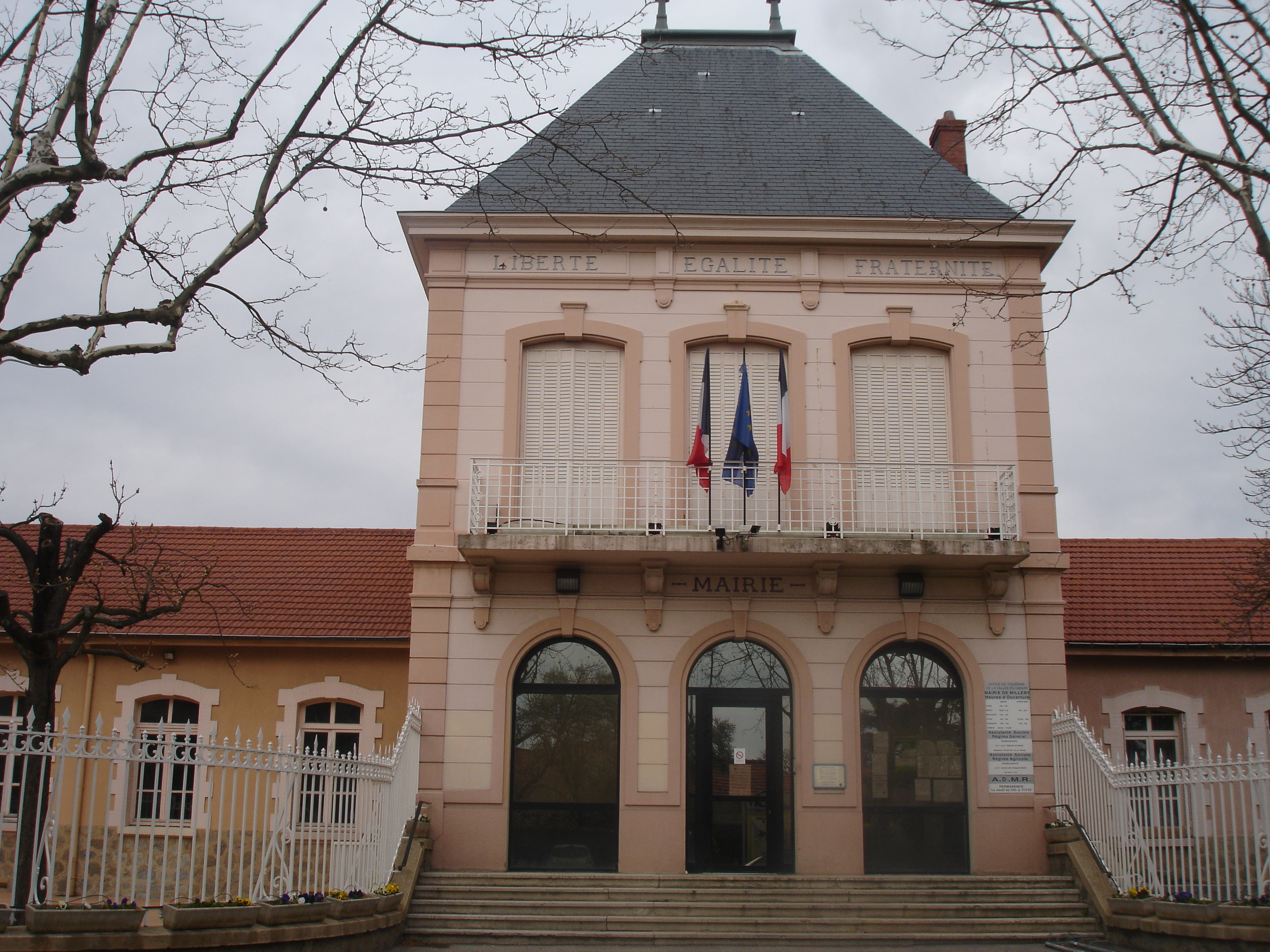
- The town hall in Millery

- Coat of arms
- Location of Millery
- Location within France Location within Auvergne-Rhône-Alpes
- Coordinates: 45°38′00″N 4°46′58″E
- Country: France
- Region: Auvergne-Rhône-Alpes
- Department: Rhône
- Arrondissement: Lyon
- Canton: Saint-Symphorien-d'Ozon
- Intercommunality: CC de la Vallée du Garon

Government
  - Mayor (2026–2032): Jean-Marc Bugnet
- Area^{1}: 9.22 km^{2} (3.56 sq mi)
- Elevation: 160 m (520 ft)
- Highest elevation: 304 m (997 ft)
- Lowest elevation: 155 m (509 ft)
- Population (2023): 4,299
  - Density: 466/km^{2} (1,210/sq mi)
- Time zone: UTC+01:00 (CET)
  - Summer (DST): UTC+02:00 (CEST)
- INSEE/Postal code: 69133 /69390
- ^{1} French Land Register data, which excludes lakes, ponds, glaciers > 1 km^{2} (0.386 sq mi or 247 acres) and river estuaries.

Millery (French pronunciation: [mijʁi]) is a commune in the Rhône department in eastern France.

== Population ==
Historical population
Year	Pop.	±% p.a.
1968	1,792	—
1975	2,163	+2.72%
1982	2,502	+2.10%
1990	3,006	+2.32%
1999	3,411	+1.41%
2007	3,475	+0.23%
2012	3,686	+1.19%
2017	4,331	+3.28%
2023	4,299	−0.12%
Source: INSEE

== See also ==
- Communes of the Rhône department
