= Henri Meyer =

French caricaturist and illustrator (1841–1899)

Jacques Meyer, known as Henri Meyer and Reyem (6 March 1841, in Mulhouse – 18 July 1899, in Thiais) was a French caricaturist and illustrator; best known for his work with the publishing firm of Hetzel, where he produced engravings for the works of Jules Verne.

Among his most notable illustrations may be mentioned those for Dick Sand, A Captain at Fifteen by Verne and The Indian Frontier by Lucien Biart, as well as major works by Thérèse Bentzon and Thomas Mayne Reid. He also designed numerous illustrations for periodicals; including a large number of covers for the Supplément illustré of Le Petit Journal, which were engraved by Fortuné Méaulle.

He was named a Chevalier in the Legion of Honor in 1884.

His son, who went by the name Jan-Méjan, was also a designer and illustrator.

== Selected works ==
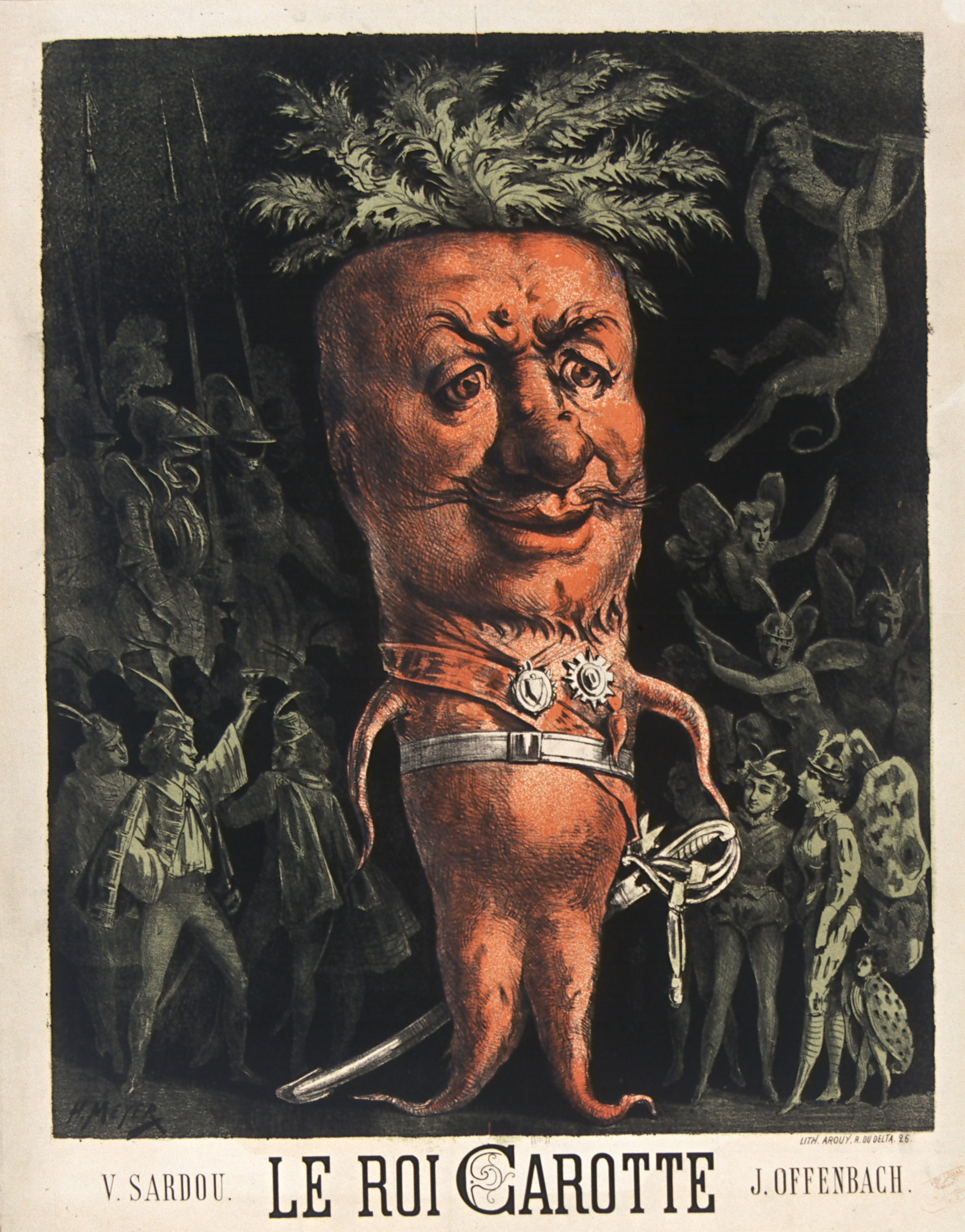
Poster for Le Roi Carotte

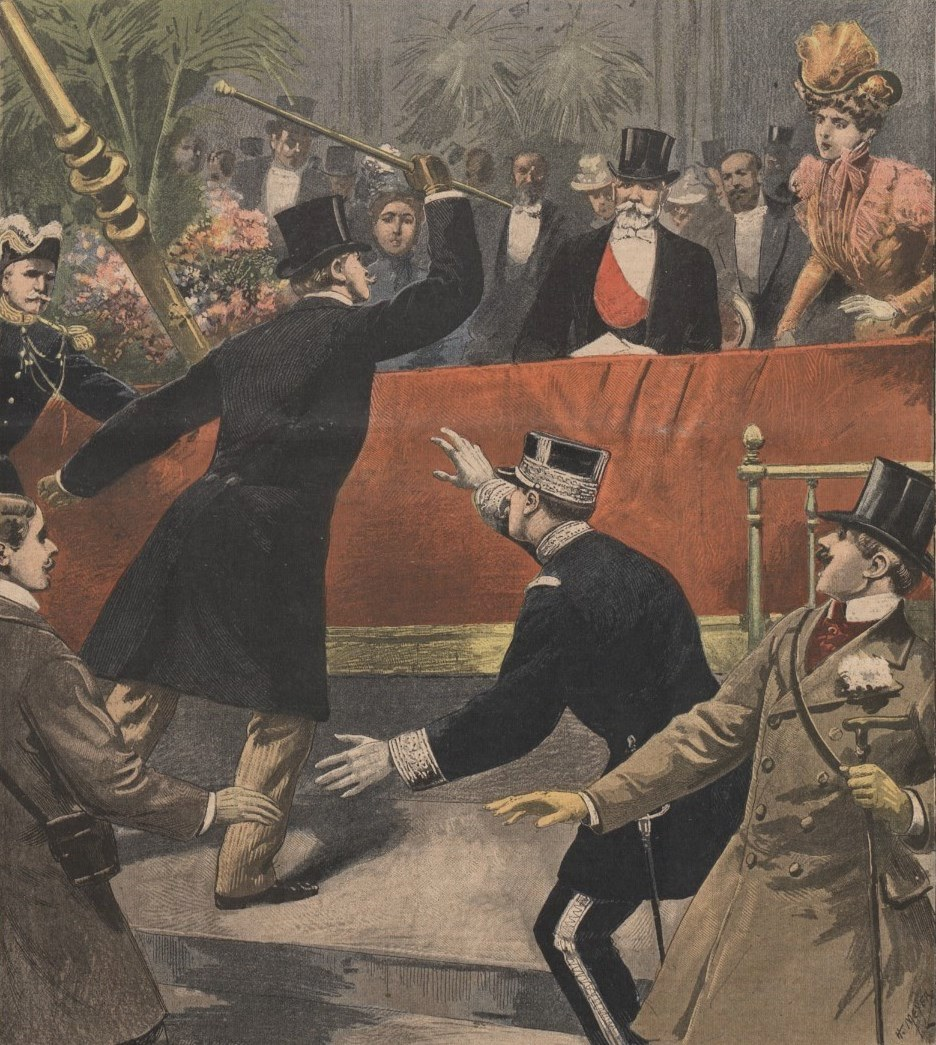
President Émile Loubet, attacked at Auteuil

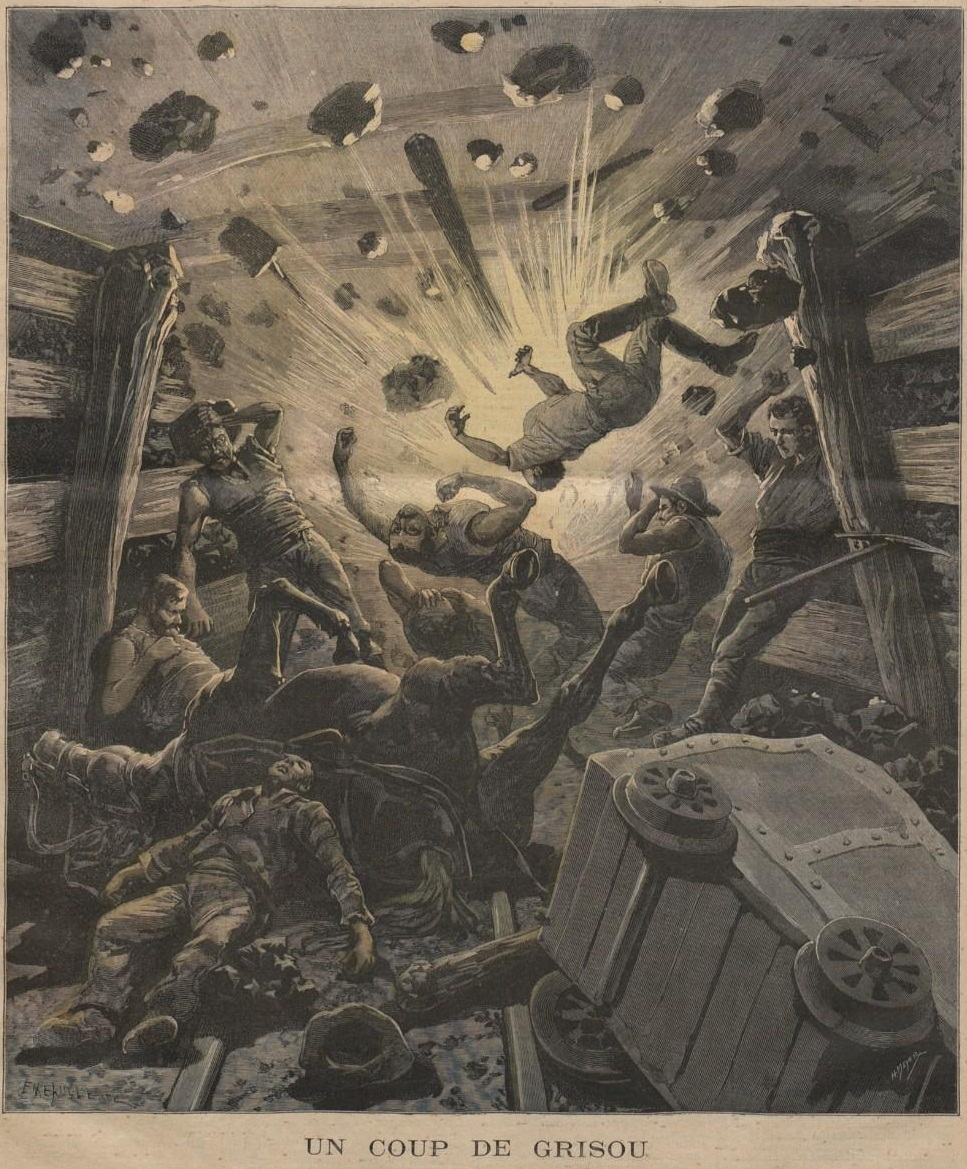
Firedamp Explosion
in a Mine

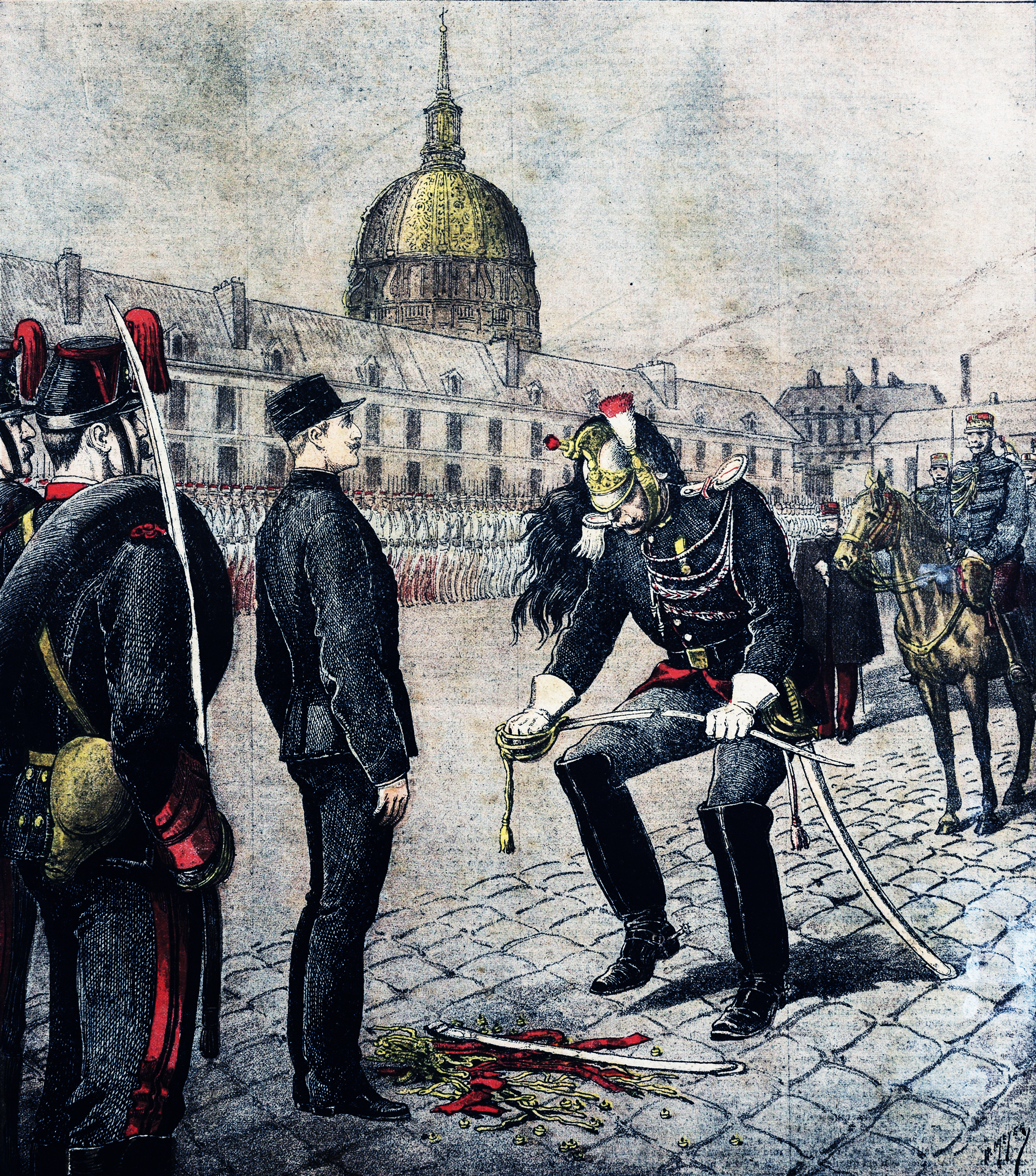
The Cashiering of
Alfred Dreyfus

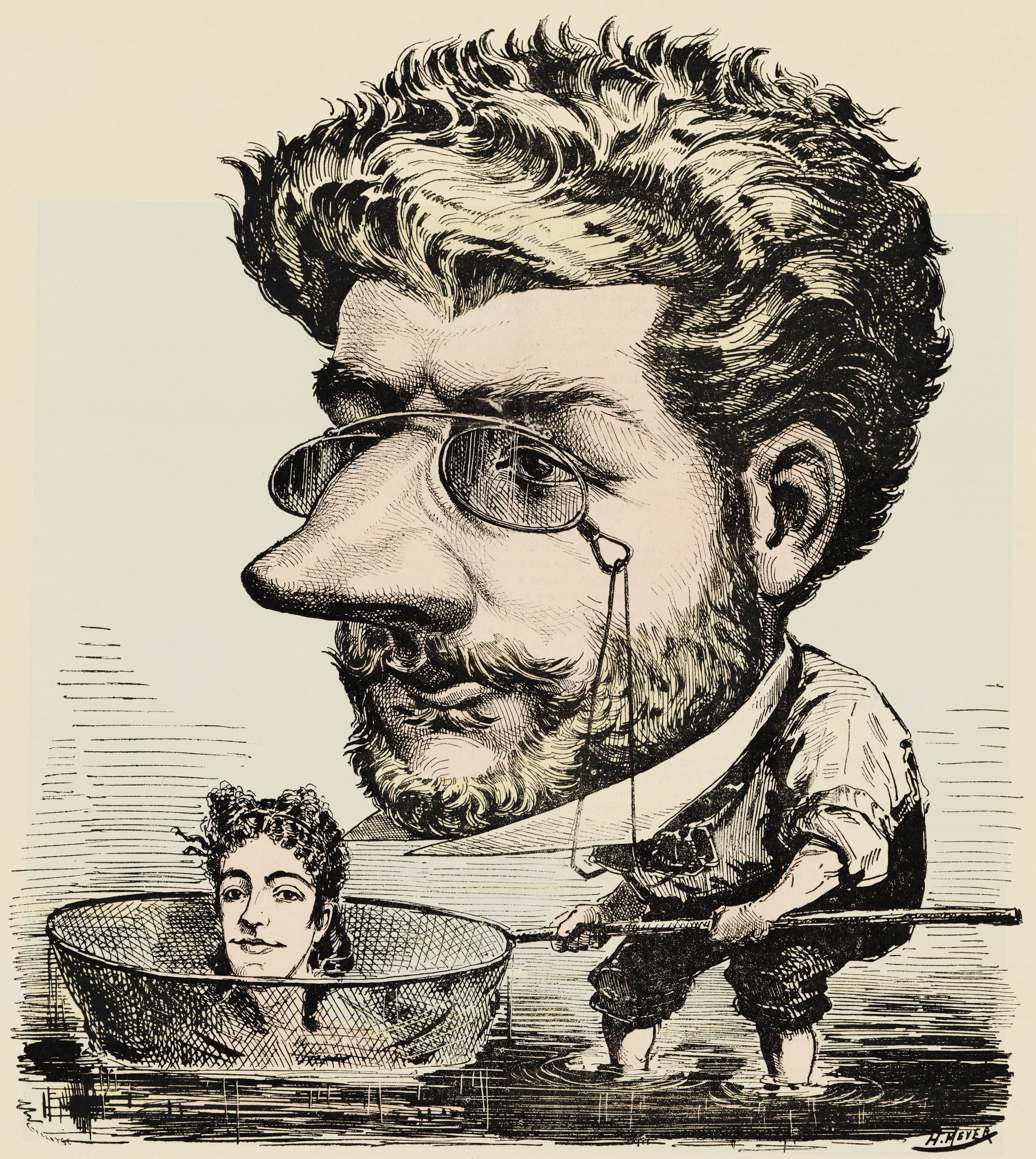
Georges Bizet
