= André Moulonguet =

French medical doctor

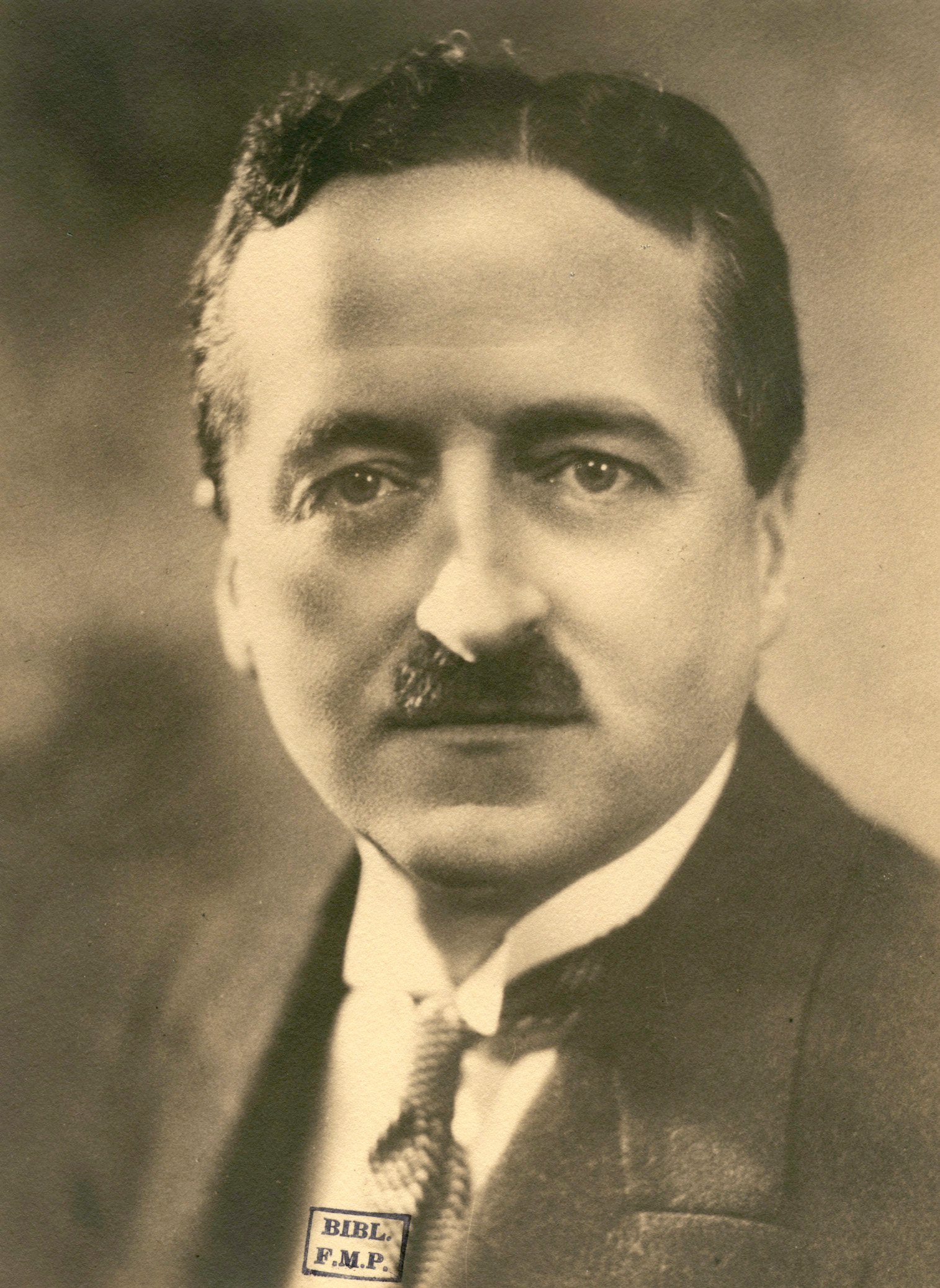
- Born: January 9, 1887; Pau, Pyrénées-Atlantiques
- Died: December 6, 1983 (aged 96)
- Known for: Otorhinolaryngologist of Hôpitaux de Paris
- Medical career
- Profession: Medical doctor
- Institutions: Hôpitaux de Paris
- Sub-specialties: Otorhinolaryngology

André Moulonguet was a French medical doctor. He worked as otorhinolaryngologist at Hôpitaux de Paris.

== History ==
Born in Pau, Moulonguet started as student in 1903 at the Faculty of Medicine at the University of Paris, then interned at Hôpitaux de Paris in 1910. He also worked at the surgical departments at Necker–Enfants Malades Hospital under Édouard Kirmisson and at later at Pitié-Salpêtrière Hospital. He was also an assistant of Marcel Lermoyez at Hôpital Saint-Antoine. As World War One started he was assigned to an ambulance corps in the Troupes coloniales in Champagne and later served in a mobile surgical unit.

He married Aline Boucher in 1919. They had three children.

Moulonguet published several books over his career, including one dealing with vertigo in 1927 and another about otology in 1933.

He studied the functioning of the human larynx in 1952–1953.

He was elected member of the Académie Nationale de Médecine, surgical section, in 1947, was a former president of the section, and became member emeritus in 1979.
