= AP-HP Sorbonne University Hospital Group =

Coordinates: 48°50′24″N 2°22′12″E

- Greater Paris University Hospitals (AP-HP)
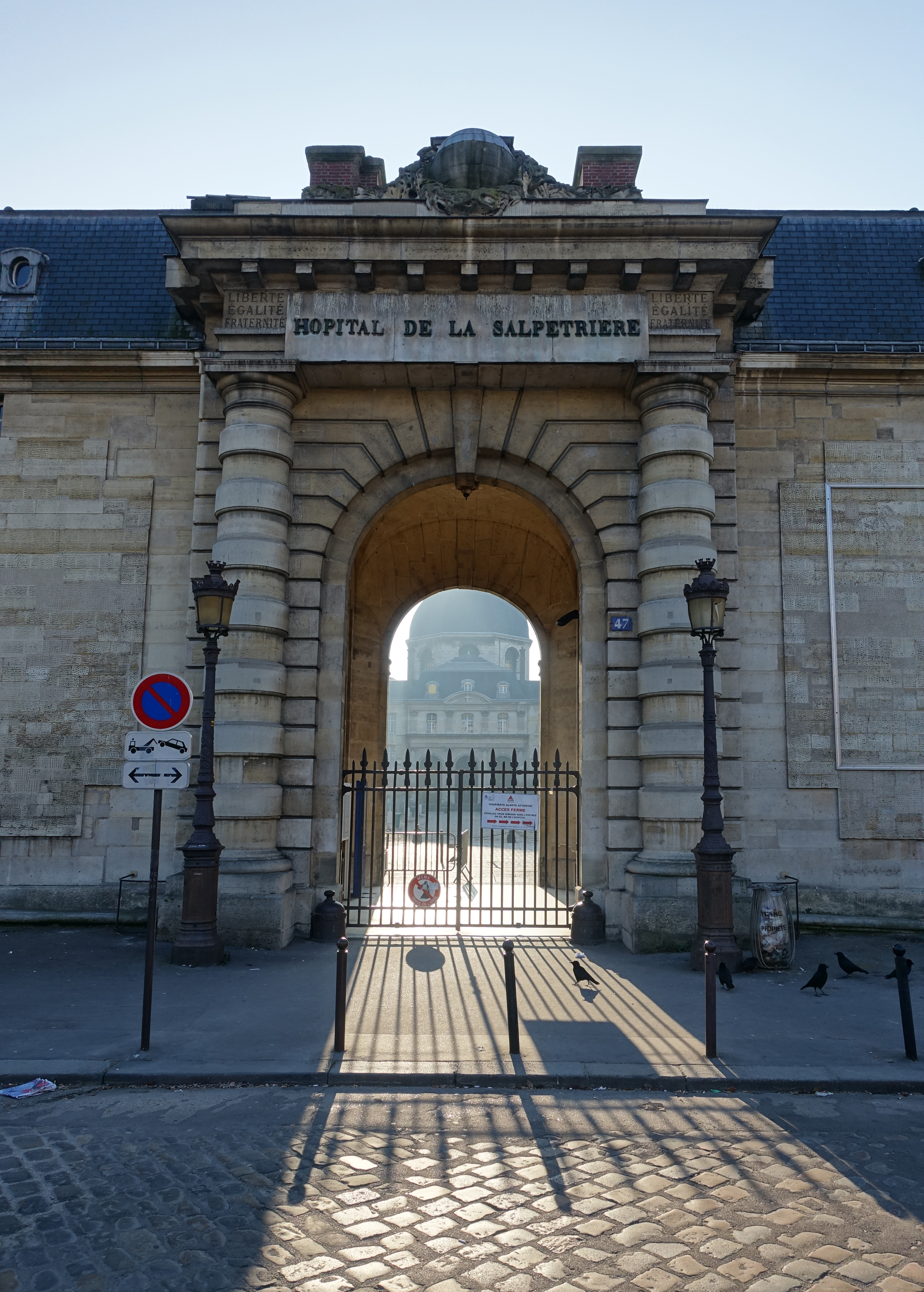

Organisation
- Type: University hospital, Teaching hospital
- Affiliated university: Sorbonne University
- Patron: Christine Welty

Services
- Beds: 4,036

History
- Former names: Pitié-Salpêtrière – Charles-Foix Hospital Group, Est Parisien Hospital Group
- Opened: 2011

Links
- Website: https://pitiesalpetriere.aphp.fr/

The AP-HP Sorbonne University Hospital Group is a university hospital group resulting from the merger in 2019 of Pitié-Salpêtrière – Charles-Foix Hospital Group and the Est Parisien Hospital Group, affiliated to Sorbonne University. It brings together 7 university hospitals, including the Pitié-Salpêtrière Hospital (itself the result of the merger of the Salpêtrière and Pitié hospitals in 1964) and the Charles-Foix Hospital, which have been part of a joint hospital group since 2011, as well as the Saint-Antoine Hospital, Rothschild Hospital, Tenon Hospital and Armand-Trousseau Hospital, which were part of the former Est Parisien Hospital Group.

The AP-HP Sorbonne University Hospital Group is one of the six university hospital groups of the Greater Paris University Hospitals – AP-HP, and is part of the Sorbonne University Faculty of Health Sciences.

The university hospital group is home to research centers of international stature, including the Paris Brain Institute and the Institut de cardiométabolisme et nutrition (ICAN) at Pitié-Salpêtrière, and the Institut de la longévité Charles-Foix, a research center dedicated to aging.

== History ==
On January 1, 2011, the Pitié-Salpêtrière Hospital and the Charles Foix Hospital were merged into the new Pitié-Salpêtrière – Charles-Foix Hospital Group as part of the reorganization of Greater Paris University Hospitals into 12 hospital groups.

On July 3, 2019, the Pitié-Salpêtrière – Charles-Foix Hospital Group merged with the Est Parisien Hospital Group to form the new Sorbonne University University Hospital Group, as part of a new reorganization of Greater Paris University Hospitals – AP-HP into 6 new university hospital groups. Christine Welty appointed director of the new hospital group.

== Organization ==
=== Hospitals ===
- Pitié-Salpêtrière Hospital
- Charles-Foix Hospital
- Saint-Antoine Hospital
- Rothschild Hospital
- Tenon Hospital
- Armand-Trousseau Hospital
- La Roche-Guyon Hospital

== In popular culture ==
Scenes from season 2 of the French TV series Baron Noir (2018) are shot at the Pitié-Salpêtrière hospital. Victoria Mas's novel Le Bal des folles, published by Éditions Albin Michel, is set there.

== See also ==
- Greater Paris University Hospitals
- Sorbonne University
