= Bertrand Zadoc-Kahn =

French cardiologist

Bertrand Zadoc-Kahn (20 November 1901 – 17 June 1940) was a French cardiologist. He committed suicide when French forces were defeated by Nazi Germany in 1940.

== Biography ==
He was born in the 8th arrondissement of Paris to Suzanne Lang and Dr. Léon Zadoc-Kahn, Chief Medical Officer of the Rothschild Hospital in Paris and president of the central committee of Keren haYesod France. His grandfather was Zadoc Kahn, the chief rabbi of France. He had a sister, Jacqueline Zadoc-Kahn Eisenmann and a brother, Jean Zadoc-Kahn.

He became an intern at Paris hospitals in 1926. Around this time, he and his family had professional, educational and social connexions with well-known and to-be-famous people, such as physicists Paul Langevin and Satyendra Nath Bose, the latter who was on a two-year visit to Europe (and whose knowledge of Hebrew impressed his family), socialite Philippe de Rothschild, racing driver fr:Guy Bouriat, industrialist and racing driver André Dubonnet and film maker fr:Pierre Schwab. Zadoc-Kahn completed his doctoral thesis in 1931.

When World War II began, he was an established cardiologist and the chief doctor of the American Hospital of Paris, the focus of which had changed because of the war. His sister volunteered to work in an air ministry laboratory. When the French forces were defeated by Nazi Germany in 1940, Zadoc-Kahn was in such despair that he took his own life by shooting himself. It was reported that he was being lined up to take over his father's role at the Rothschild Hospital in Paris. In a note to his father, he said that he was unable to accept the disastrous situation for France which he had experienced as an army physician. Eugene Meyer, the U.S. financier and a second-cousin to him, had offered sanctuary to his father; however, the Zadoc-Kahns were so devastated by their son's death that they declined: they went into hiding in France, as did their daughter and her family. His parents were discovered three years later by gendarmes and murdered at Auschwitz concentration camp in 1943. His sister survived the war. Zadoc-Kahn and his father are listed amongst the victims of World War II by the Amicale des Anciens Internes des Hôpitaux de Paris.

== Published papers ==
- Les Anomalies électro-cardiographiques au cours de la diphtérie, signification clinique et valeur pronostique [ Electrocardiographic abnormalities during diphtheria, its clinical significance and value in prognosis ] [thesis]; les Presses universitaires de France, Thèses de médecine. Paris. 1931. N° 526
- Astrocytome kystique du cervelet, ablation de la tumeur murale, guérison par M. Clovis Vincent, Mlle Fanny Rappoport, M. Bertrand Zadoc-Kahn; Cystic [ Astrocytoma of the cerebellum, removal of the tumour wall and healing]; Revue neurologique [Neurological Review] January 1932, société française d'imprimerie, Poitiers, 1932
- Valeur pratique de l'électro-cardiographie au cours de la diphtérie [Practical value of electrocardiography during diphtheria]; E. Lesné et B. Zadoc-Kahn; "Revue française de pédiatrie" [French Pediatric Review] Vol. 9, N° 4, Gaston Doin et Cie, editors, Paris, 1933

== Related pages ==
- Zadoc Kahn
- Léon Zadoc-Kahn
- Jacqueline Zadoc-Kahn Eisenmann
