= Jacqueline Zadoc-Kahn Eisenmann =

French physicist

Jacqueline Zadoc-Kahn Eisenmann (13 January 1904 – 15 May 1998) was a French physicist. She was born in Paris to Suzanne Lang and Dr. Léon Zadoc-Kahn, former Chief Medical Officer of the Rothschild Hospital in Paris and president of the central committee of Keren haYesod France. Her grandfather was Zadoc Kahn, the chief rabbi of France.

== Life and career ==
During her studies, she was a student of the Russian-born astronomer Benjamin Jekhowsky, of the Paris Observatory and then at the Algiers Observatory. In 1924, after she had completed her license de sciences physiques, she worked in the laboratories of the physicist Aimé Cotton at the science faculty of the University of Paris (now University of Paris-Saclay). In the 1920s and 1930s, she presented research papers on liquid crystals (using the term "mesomorphic substances"), particularly para-Azoxyanisole, variations in its anisotropy due to thermal effects and her PhD thesis (1936) covered its electro- and magneto-optical properties; in doing this she was one of the very few scientists developing a field which was little more than a point of interest for three more decades until the first demonstration of liquid crystal display technology in the late 1960s. She had regular contact with leading contemporary scientists of the day, including theoretical physicist Satyendra Nath Bose, to whom she was introduced by her father's friend, Sylvain Lévi, an expert in Sanskrit and oriental studies. They first met in 1924 at lectures of Paul Langevin at the Collège de France in Paris and then at those of Louis de Broglie; Bose stayed in Paris with her during his year-long sojourn in Europe in the 1920s. She was very impressed with his knowledge of Hebrew literature and religion and noted his lack of personal ambition. He retained a deep personal affection for her, later relating to her the conversations and lectures of Albert Einstein, Werner Heisenberg and Erwin Schrödinger.

She married Jacques Charles Eisenmann, an engineer from Dijon two years her elder, on 22 December 1930 in the 8th arrondissement of Paris. In 1932, her daughter Irène was born and, in 1936, her son Daniel. When World War II began, she volunteered to work in a laboratory of the air ministry. When the French forces were defeated by Nazi Germany in 1940, her brother, Bertrand Zadoc-Kahn (20 November 1901 - 17 June 1940), a cardiologist at the American Hospital of Paris, committed suicide by shooting himself. The American financier, Eugene Meyer, had offered sanctuary to her father - Meyer's cousin - in the US, as he had already resettled two other families of his European relatives; the Zadoc-Kahns declined, however, so deeply affected were they by their son's death. During the Vichy government era of World War II that followed, her parents were sent to Auschwitz concentration camp, amongst 76,000 Jews who were rounded up and deported from France; they were killed in the camp in 1943.; (Note: Summary from data compiled by L'Association des Fils et Filles des déportés juifs de France, 1985, by Serge Klarsfeld.) She herself was hidden by a Roman Catholic family for the duration of the war.

After World War II, she worked at fr:L'Institut français du caoutchouc (IFC) (French Rubber Institute), in their documentation service. She met Bose again upon his return to Europe in 1951, an event which she described as her first happiness after the death of her parents.

She died on 15 May 1998, aged 94.

== Legacy ==
1017 Jacqueline, a carbonaceous asteroid, discovered in 1924 by her former teacher Benjamin Jekhowsky at the Algiers Observatory, was named in her honour.

== Published papers ==
- 1929: The refractive indices of a mesomorphic substance in the solid state; Nature volume 123, pages 113–115, 19 January 1929
- 1930: Thermal variation of the magnetic birefringence of p-azoxyanisole above the temperature of disappearance of the mesomorphous state; Nature, Societies and Academies PARIS. Academy of Sciences, 10 December 1930
- 1936: Sur les propriétés magnéto-optiques et électro-optiques du para-azoxyanisol; Annales de Physique, volume 11 No.6, pages 455–501. Published online: 2017-04-28 DOI: https://doi.org/10.1051/anphys/193611060455
