= Léon Zadoc-Kahn =

French medical doctor and victim of the Holocaust

Léon Zadoc-Kahn (2 September 1870 – 23 November 1943) was a French medical doctor, the Chief Medical Officer of the Rothschild Hospital, Paris, treasurer of the Curie Foundation and the Chair of the Central Committee of Keren haYesod, France. During the time of Vichy France, he was arrested and transported with his wife from his homeland to Auschwitz Concentration Camp where they were murdered.

== Biography ==
Zadoc-Kahn was born on 2 September 1870, in the 3rd arrondissement of Paris. He was one of six children of Ernestine Meyer and Zadoc Kahn, the Chief Rabbi of France; his sisters were Hélène, Anne and Berthe; his brothers were Paul and Edmond. He began a medical career as an intern in Paris hospitals from 1892. He qualified as a medical doctor in 1897. In 1899, he married Suzanne Esther Lang, who was born on 26 March 1876 in Paris to Fleurette Silz Lang and Ernest Lang, a textile manufacturer. He is recorded on his marriage certificate as being a doctor at Hôtel-Dieu de Paris. They had three children, Bertrand, Jacqueline and Jean. In 1914, he became the Chief Medical Officer of the Rothschild Hospital and remained in that role until his murder. He was a board member and assistant treasurer of the Curie Foundation in 1924, and later treasurer.

In 1915, during World War I, he travelled as a military doctor aboard the hospital ship, the Sphinx, as part of the Allied Powers' expedition to Salonika, to rally the large Jewish population of the city to the Allied cause, to help the beleaguered (mostly French) troops; this resulted in the creation of the Macedonian front. He had the rank of major in 1918 and was awarded the Croix de Guerre and the Cross of the Order of St. Sava (from Serbia).

In 1923, his wife Suzanne co-founded the Jewish Women's Union for Palestine with feminist advocate Yvonne Netter; the Union later became the French section of the Women's International Zionist Organization. In 1925, he became one of the eight-member editorial board of La Revue juive (The Jewish Review) - a short-lived journal begun by Albert Cohen, the aim of which was to be at the political centre of the perceived contemporary Jewish renaissance; - other members included Albert Einstein, Sigmund Freud, Georg Brandes and Charles Gide.

Upon the defeat of France to Nazi forces in 1940, Zadoc-Kahn's son, Bertrand, a cardiologist at the American Hospital of Paris shot himself in despair. Katharine Graham, owner of The Washington Post, wrote how her father, Eugene Meyer, the American financier and cousin of Zadoc-Kahn who had lived with him for six months, offered to resettle his family to the US as he had with others. Zadoc-Kahn and his wife were too devastated at their son's suicide and declined the offer. The couple went into hiding in a village on the outskirts of Paris; their daughter, Jacqueline, was hidden by a catholic family. Annette Benacerraf, Zadoc-Kahn's grand-niece, related to her husband (Nobel laureate, Baruj Benacerraf) how one of his last known addresses in France was in Le Ruel, Haravilliers in Seine-et-Oise, north-west of Paris (now part of the Val d'Oise département) (Note: Summary from data compiled by L'Association des Fils et Filles des déportés juifs de France, 1985, by Serge Klarsfeld. FFDJF (Fils et filles de déportés juifs de France).) and from here a letter was sent by Zadoc-Kahn to Désirée Damengout, a nursing colleague at the Rothschild Hospital, containing the following:

"I beg you to convey my wishes to all my friends on Santerre Street, nurses and doctors. If you have the time, I will be very happy to hear from you and all of you."

The couple was discovered in a house at Marines, Seine et Oise, on 1 November 1943 by the French gendarmérie and taken away. They were transported on Convoy No. 62, on 20 November, from Le Camp de Drancy (Drancy internment camp) to Auschwitz [most of the approximately 76,000 French Jews who were rounded up and sent to German concentration camps went through Drancy]. They were killed on their arrival at Auschwitz on 23 November. Meyer found out about their arrest and disappearance from Adolphe Dreyfus in New York in the spring of 1944. He kept a portrait of Zadoc-Kahn in his New York home. Jacqueline Zadoc-Kahn survived the war.

== Legacy ==
- A commemorative plaque bearing Zadoc-Kahn's name hangs inside the Hôtel-Dieu de Paris, 4th arrondissement of Paris.
- Zadoc-Kahn's name is on the Mur des Nomes du Mémorial de la Shoah (the Wall of Names of the Shoah Memorial, in the 4th arrondissement).

== Published works ==
- Deux cas de diabète grave chez des jeunes sans urobiline. [Two cases of severe diabetes in young people without urobilin] [location: L'Hôpital Saint-Antoine]; Archives générales de médecine", December 1896, page 15, Paris, Asselin et Houzeau, 1896.
- Étude sur la régénération du foie dans les états pathologiques (kystes hydatiques cirrhose alcoolique hypertrophique). [Study of the regeneration of the liver in pathology] [Thesis]; État civil de Paris, 1896–1897, tome 24, no. 185, Paris, 1897
- Résumé des titres et travaux scientifiques du Docteur Léon Kahn. [Summary of titles and works of Dr. Léon Kahn] (following the requirements of legal deposition Dépôt légal en France) page 4, Paris, G. Steinheil, 1900.
- Résumé des titres et travaux scientifiques du docteur Léon Z. Kahn. [Summary of titles and works of Dr. Léon Z. Kahn] (following the requirements of legal deposition Dépôt légal en France) page 4, Paris, G. Steinheil, 1902 25.
