= Raymond Turpin =

French geneticist (1895–1988)

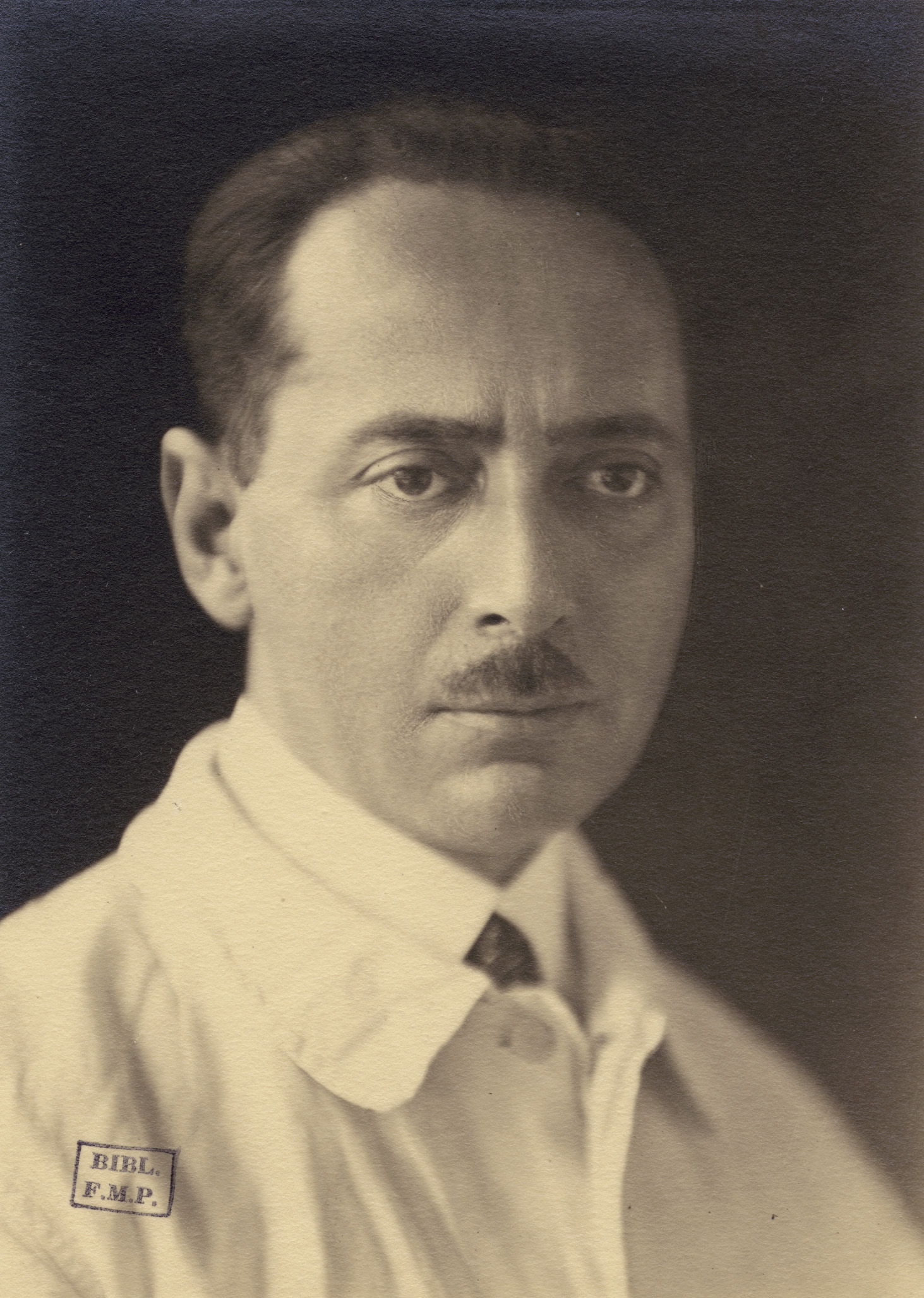
- Born: Raymond Alexander Turpin; 5 November 1895; Pontoise, France
- Died: 24 May 1988 (aged 92); Paris
- Education: Faculty of Medicine of Paris
- Known for: Investigation of Down syndrome
- Awards: Croix de Guerre
- Scientific career
- Fields: Pathology, pediatrics, genetics
- Institutions: Pasteur Institute, Paris
- Notable students: Jérôme Lejeune, Marthe Gautier

Raymond Alexander Turpin, born 5 November 1895 in Pontoise, died May 24, 1988, in Paris, was a French pediatrician and geneticist. In the late 1950s, his team discovered the chromosomal abnormality, trisomy 21, responsible for Down syndrome.

== Early years ==
Turpin was admitted to the Faculty of Medicine of Paris in 1914, and in 1915 he was mobilized as a military medical assistant. Three years later, he was seriously affected by poison gas, and was subsequently awarded the Croix de Guerre. After the war, he resumed his medical studies, interning at Hôpitaux de Paris in 1921. As part of the Pasteur Institute, he participated, with Albert Calmette and Benjamin Weill-Hallé, in the first trials of the BCG vaccine, to prevent TB, and continued the collaboration until 1933.

He also worked in pathology and pediatrics, including childhood tetany. In 1929, tetany was the topic of his medical thesis, for which he won the Thesis Prize of the Faculty of Medicine. In this work, he highlighted a specific electromyographic sign of tetany. After being named head of the laboratory and clinical director, he became Doctor of the Paris Hospitals in 1929.

== Down syndrome to trisomy 21 ==
From 1931, Turpin and his team researched Down syndrome. He studied the clinical presentation of the disease in affected individuals, their ancestors, descendants and siblings. In 1937, he wrote: "The assumption that mongolism is connected with a chromosomal abnormality is acceptable (...) like the Bar mutation, due to a chromosomal abnormality in the (fly) drosophila." In 1956, several teams established that the number of human chromosomes is 46, and it became possible to count the number of chromosomes in a sample in the laboratory.

From 1956 to 1958, Turpin - with students Jérôme Lejeune and Marthe Gautier - studied the number and appearance of chromosomes in the cells of children with and without Down syndrome, and in 1958 they found that children with Down syndrome possess 47 chromosomes: they carry three copies (trisomy) of one chromosome instead of the usual two (disomy). This chromosome was designated chromosome 21 in 1960.

Turpin discovered, in 1959, the first structural chromosomal abnormality translocation, the second of the two main types of chromosomal abnormalities.

In 1947, Turpin founded the French Genetics Society, of which he became president in 1954. He was appointed professor at the Faculty of Medicine of Paris, first in therapeutics (1947–1956), and then in infant health and medicine. He was elected president of the French Society of Pediatrics in 1960 and participated in the creation of the first chair of genetics in 1965 which was initially entrusted to Jérôme Lejeune. He was also elected member of the French Academy of Sciences, Académie Nationale de Médecine and the Académie nationale de pharmacie.
