= Devota (disambiguation) =

Devota, in French: Sainte Dévote; died ca. 303 AD, a Christian saint killed during the persecutions of Diocletian and Maximian. She is the patroness saint of Corsica and Monaco.

Devota may also refer to:

- 1328 Devota, outer main-belt asteroid discovered by Jekhovsky, B. at Algiers
- Devota (novel), by Augusta Jane Evans Wilson published in 1907
