= Marthe Gautier =

French physician (1925–2022)

- Born: 10 September 1925; Montenils, France
- Died: 30 April 2022 (aged 96)
- Education: Hôpitaux de Paris
- Occupation: Medical doctor
- Known for: Role in the discovery of Down syndrome
- Scientific career
- Fields: Pediatric cardiology
- Workplaces: Hôpitaux de Paris, Harvard, Hôpital Trousseau
- Thesis: (1955)
- Doctoral advisor: Robert Debré

Marthe Gautier (French pronunciation: [maʁt ɡotje]; 10 September 1925 – 30 April 2022) was a French medical doctor and researcher. She discovered the cause of Down syndrome being the existence of a third instance of chromosome 21 in 1958, after which the disorder was given the additional name trisomy 21. This discovery made it possible to prenatally diagnose the disorder. A colleague of hers, Jérôme Lejeune, took full credit for the discovery. In 2009, she published a testimony of her own role in the discovery.

== Education ==
Marthe Gautier discovered a vocation for pediatrics at an early age. After graduating from a boarding school in 1942, she joined her sister Paulette who was about to complete her medical studies in Paris intending to become a pediatrician. She passed the entrance exam of the "Internat des hôpitaux de Paris" and spent the next four years as an intern gaining clinical experience in pediatrics. During WWII, Paulette was killed by a stray bullet during Nazi occupation, but Gautier stayed and went on to finish her medical training; she was one of two women in the program and studied under the mentorship of Robert Debré.

In 1955 she submitted and defended her thesis in pediatric cardiology under the direction of Robert Debré. Her thesis focused on the study of clinical and anatomical pathology of fatal forms of rheumatic fever (a cause of rheumatic endocarditis) due to streptococcus infection.

Robert Debré, in charge of pediatrics in France at the time, offered Gautier a scholarship for one year at Harvard University in order to acquire knowledge in pediatric cardiology with two main objectives. The first was to eradicate rheumatic fever, using penicillin and the treatment of sometimes life-threatening cardiovascular disease with cortisone; the second was to create a department for diagnosis and surgery of congenital heart diseases for newborns and young children.

In September 1955, Gautier left for Boston. She was accompanied by Jean Aicardi and Jacques Couvreur, both Fulbright scholars, and the three became the first interns of the Hôpitaux de Paris to be awarded scholarships for the US. At Harvard, one of the tasks of her internship was to be trained as a laboratory technician working in cell culture. Besides the two objectives that had been set initially, Gautier was also working part-time as a cell culture technician to obtain in-vitro cultures of fibroblast starting from aorta fragments.

After a year in Boston, Gautier returned to Paris. Meanwhile, her job in the pediatric cardiology service at the Bicêtre Hospital in Paris had been given to a colleague during her absence. However, she learned that there was a position available at the Trousseau Hospital, in Raymond Turpin's team.

Turpin's research was focused on polymalformative syndromes, of which the most common is trisomy, characterized by intellectual disability and morphological abnormalities. At the time, Turpin favored the hypothesis of a chromosomal origin of trisomy but there was no laboratory for cell culture in France and the number of human chromosomes was estimated at 48, but without any certainty.

== Down syndrome ==
=== Laboratory cell culture ===
In 1956, biologists from Lund University in Sweden announced that humans have exactly 46 chromosomes. Turpin had many years earlier proposed the idea of culturing cells to count the number of chromosomes in trisomy. Gautier had recently joined the pediatrics group he headed at the Armand-Trousseau Hospital, and she offered to attempt this, since she had been trained in both cell culture and tissue staining techniques in the United States. Turpin agreed to provide her with tissue samples from patients with Down syndrome. With very limited resources Gautier set up the first in vitro cell culture laboratory in France.

In order to count the chromosomes, Gautier worked on fibroblasts derived from connective tissue, which were easier to obtain under local anesthesia. Although the principle of cell culture is simple, there were many practical obstacles to getting it to work under the primitive conditions available to Gautier, who was forced to use a personal loan to purchase laboratory glassware and, at times, her own blood as a source of human serum. She eventually confirmed that the protocol worked, using connective tissue donated by a neighbouring surgeon, taken during planned interventions in children. She used the "hypotonic shock" method followed by drying the slide after attachment in order to disperse the chromosomes of dividing cells and make them easier to count.

Using this protocol, Gautier found that the cells of children who do not have a chromosomal abnormality have 46 chromosomes. In May 1958, she observed an additional chromosome in the cells of a trisomic boy, the first evidence of chromosomal abnormalities in individuals with Down syndrome.

=== Announcement of results ===
At the time, the laboratories at the Armand-Trousseau hospital did not have a microscope capable of capturing images of the slides. Gautier entrusted her slides to Jérôme Lejeune, a fellow researcher at CNRS, who offered to take pictures in another laboratory better equipped for this task. In August 1958 the photographs identified the supernumerary chromosome in patients with Down syndrome. However, according to Gautier's account, Lejeune did not return the slides, but instead reported the discovery as his own.

In January 1959, by studying new cases and to forestall similar research by the English, the Trousseau laboratory announced the results of the analysis of the slides in the Proceedings of the Academy of Sciences through a paper published with Lejeune as first author, Gautier second (her surname misspelled as Gauthier) and Turpin last author.

The Turpin team also identified the first translocation and the first chromosomal deletion, resulting in publications Gautier co-signed.

=== Attribution of the discovery ===
In April 1960, the condition was named trisomy 21. As of 1970 the Lejeune foundation started to promote the discovery as primarily the work of Lejeune. Gautier claimed in 2009 that she was put to one side by Turpin and by Lejeune who claimed responsibility for the discovery, even though it relied on the work that she had initiated and directed technically. Aware of having been manipulated, Gautier decided to abandon trisomy 21 and to return to caring for children affected by cardiopathy.

The Jérôme Lejeune Foundation asserts that a letter from Turpin to Lejeune in October 1958 shows that Lejeune, and not Gautier, identified the 47th chromosome. The Foundation maintains that there is no evidence that Gautier made the key discovery.

On 31 January 2014, Gautier was due to speak about her role in the discovery at the seventh biennial congress on human and medical genetics in Bordeaux, and to receive the grand prize of the French Federation of Human Genetics. The Jérôme Lejeune Foundation obtained authorisation from the Bordeaux Tribunal de Grande Instance for bailiffs to be sent to film this session. At the last minute, concerned that the recording might be used in legal proceedings it could not afford to defend, the congress organizers decided to cancel her presentation and she received her award privately instead.

The ethics committee of the Inserm has issued a note in July 2014, reminding of the decisive role of Marthe Gautier, and has built upon this case to remind of the international rules for scientific publications and listing authors. The note states that "history of discovery is not identical to the history of science, and the process of validating knowledge remains very different... As the discovery of trisomy would have been impossible without the mandatory contributions of Raymond Turpin and Marthe Gautier, it is regrettable that their names were not systematically associated with this discovery, as much in terms of communication but also in the assignment of various awards and distinctions".

In July 2026, descendants of Lejeune began legal action against the director of an Avignon Festival play based on the controversy which promoted Gautier's version; the case was initially slated to be heard at the Paris tribunal in September 2026.

== Medical career ==
After the trisomy discovery Gautier left Turpin's team and applied for a position in public health care to dedicate herself to cardio-pediatrics. She was hired by Professor Nouaille in a newly opened service at the Hospital Kremlin Biccetre. Subsequently, she became Master of Research at the INSERM.

== Recognition ==
Marthe Gautier was appointed to the rank of Officer of the French Legion of Honor and was decorated on 16 September 2014. Marthe Gautier had previously declined this distinction twice before consenting to it "by indignation towards the impudence of the Lejeune Foundation".

She was promoted to Commander of the National Order of Merit on 15 November 2018.

In 2026, Gautier was announced as one of 72 historical women in STEM whose names have been proposed to be added to the 72 men already celebrated on the Eiffel Tower. The plan was announced by the Mayor of Paris, Anne Hidalgo following the recommendations of a committee led by Isabelle Vauglin of Femmes et Sciences and Jean-François Martins, representing the operating company which runs the Eiffel Tower.

== See also ==
- Matilda effect
