= Hôpital Charles-Foix =

Public hospital in Ivry-sur-Seine, France

- AP-HP Sorbonne University Hospital Group
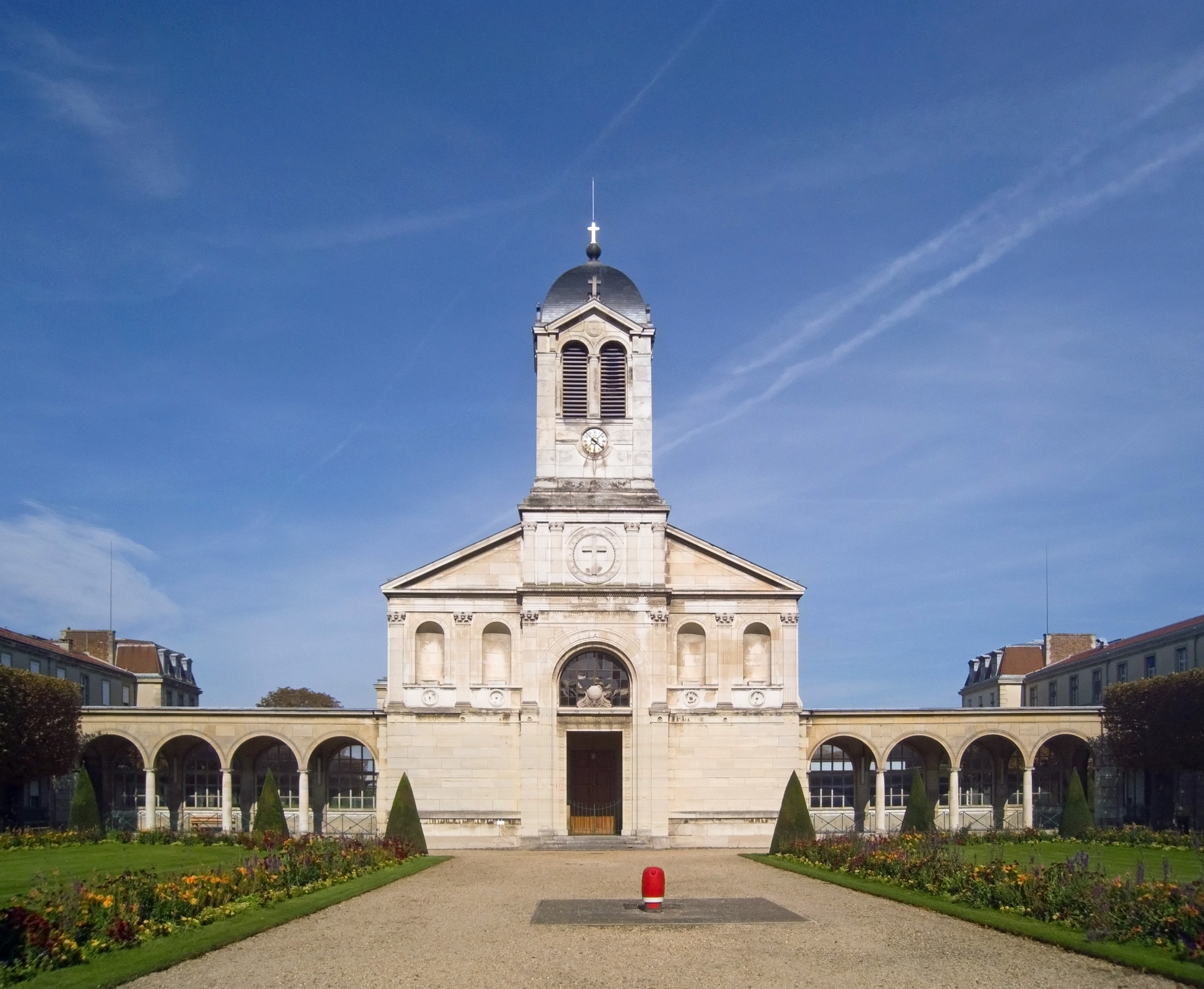
- Hôpital Charles-Foix

Geography
- Location: Ivry-sur-Seine, Île-de-France, France
- Coordinates: 48°48′20″N 2°23′47″E

History
- Opened: 1976

Links
- Website: charlesfoix.aphp.fr
- Lists: Hospitals in France

The Hôpital Charles-Foix is a public hospital from Assistance Publique–Hôpitaux de Paris (AP-HP) located at 7 avenue de la République, in Ivry-sur-Seine (Val-de-Marne).

On January 1, 2011, the two Pitié-Salpêtrière and Charles-Foix hospital groups were merged into a single hospital group.

It is affiliated with Sorbonne University.

== Notable Doctors ==
- Paul Michaux, French surgeon
