= Montenils =

- Commune
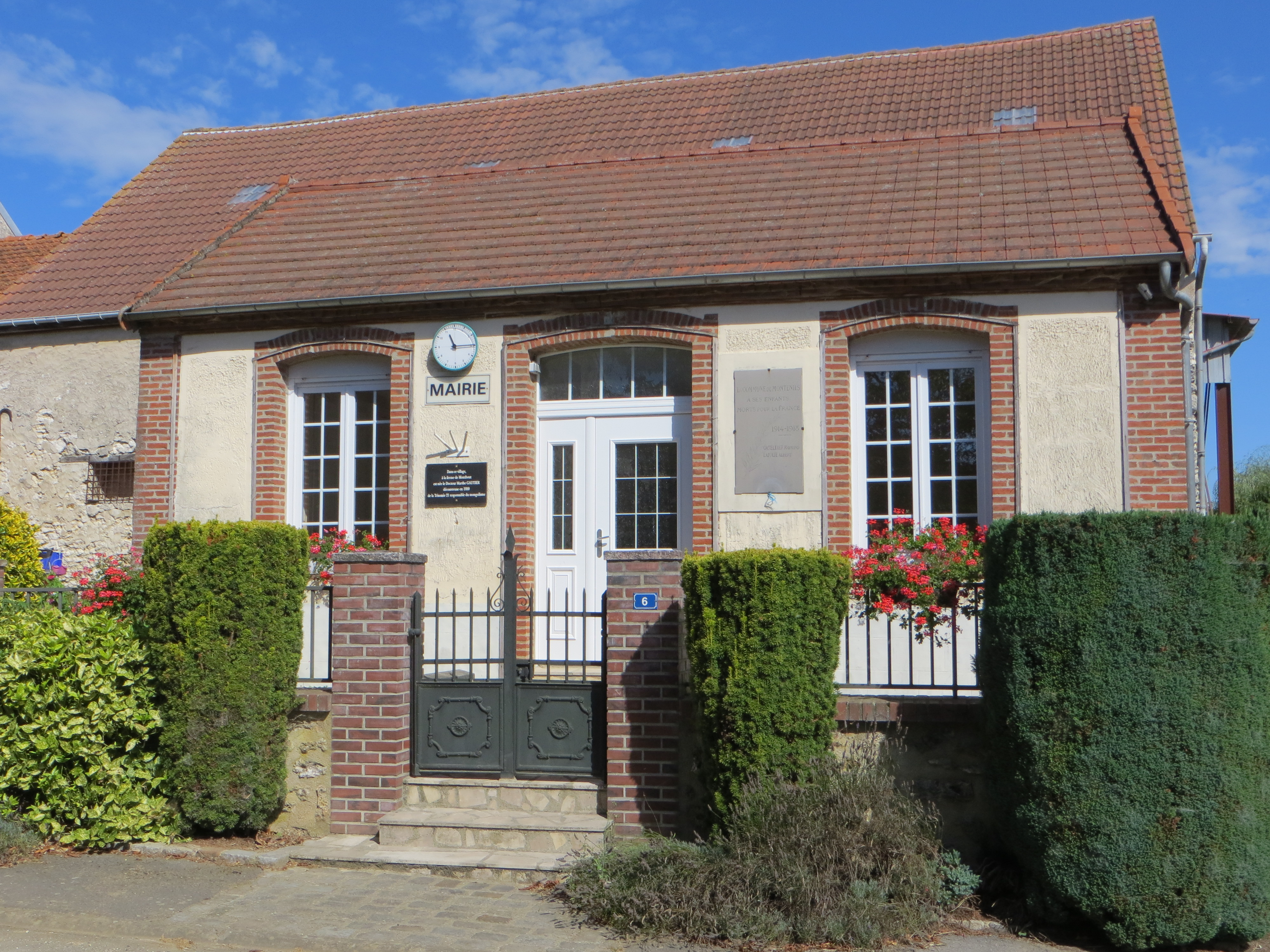
- The town hall in Montenils
- Location of Montenils
- Location within France Location within Île-de-France (region)
- Coordinates: 48°50′38″N 3°28′39″E
- Country: France
- Region: Île-de-France
- Department: Seine-et-Marne
- Arrondissement: Provins
- Canton: Coulommiers

Government
  - Mayor (2020–2026): Paul Lefebvre
- Area^{1}: 5.30 km^{2} (2.05 sq mi)
- Highest elevation: 201 m (659 ft)
- Lowest elevation: 162 m (531 ft)
- Population (2023): 34
  - Density: 6.4/km^{2} (17/sq mi)
- Time zone: UTC+01:00 (CET)
  - Summer (DST): UTC+02:00 (CEST)
- INSEE/Postal code: 77304 /77320
- ^{1} French Land Register data, which excludes lakes, ponds, glaciers > 1 km^{2} (0.386 sq mi or 247 acres) and river estuaries.

Montenils (French pronunciation: [mɔ̃tnil]) is a commune in the Seine-et-Marne department in the Île-de-France region in north-central France.

== Notable people ==
- Marthe Gautier (1925–2022), medical researcher, was born in Montenils

== See also ==
- Communes of the Seine-et-Marne department
