= 1013 Tombecka =

Metallic main-belt asteroid

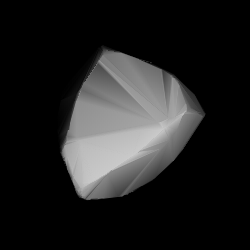
- Lightcurve-modeled shape of Tombecka

Discovery
- Discovered by: B. Jekhovsky
- Discovery site: Algiers Obs.
- Discovery date: 17 January 1924

Designations
- Named after: D. Tombeck (Faculty of Sciences of Paris)
- Alternative designations: 1924 PQ · 1953 TP_{3} 1962 VK · A905 UG; A907 GW · A924 BL
- Minor planet category: main-belt · (middle); Mitidika · Eunomia

Orbital characteristics
- Epoch 4 September 2017 (JD 2458000.5)
- Uncertainty parameter 0
- Observation arc: 111.69 yr (40,795 days)
- Aphelion: 3.2444 AU
- Perihelion: 2.1230 AU
- Semi-major axis: 2.6837 AU
- Eccentricity: 0.2089
- Orbital period (sidereal): 4.40 yr (1,606 days)
- Mean anomaly: 95.024°
- Mean motion: 0° 13^{m} 27.12^{s} / day
- Inclination: 11.901°
- Longitude of ascending node: 27.248°
- Argument of perihelion: 99.992°

Physical characteristics
- Dimensions: 31.93±1.5 km 34.057±0.434 km 34.28±0.62 km 34.613±0.290 km 34.62±10.20 km 35.18±2.24; 36.62±0.58 km
- Mass: (0.17±1.43)×10^{18} kg
- Mean density: 7.50 g/cm^{3} (no porosity)
- Synodic rotation period: 6.0 h 6.050±0.001 h (Note: Aznar (2016). Observation date: 26 November 2015. Rotation period 6.050±0.001 hours with a brightness amplitude of 0.44 mag. Quality code of 3. Summary figures for (1013) Tombecka at Collaborative Asteroid Lightcurve Link (CALL)); 6.05017 h (Note: Durech (2006): rotation period 6.05017 hours including determination of spin axis (Q=2). Summary figures for (1013) Tombecka at Collaborative Asteroid Lightcurve Link (CALL)); 6.0508±0.0001 h 6.053±0.002 h
- Geometric albedo: 0.120±0.005; 0.13±0.13; 0.132±0.014; 0.135±0.016; 0.1386±0.0321; 0.1552±0.016
- Spectral type: Tholen = XSC; M · Xk; B–V = 0.755; U–B = 0.370
- Absolute magnitude (H): 10.12 · 10.30 · 10.52±1.05

1013 Tombecka (prov. designation: A924 BL or 1924 PQ) is a metallic Mitidika asteroid from the central regions of the asteroid belt, approximately 34 kilometers in diameter. It was discovered on 17 January 1924, by Russian-French astronomer Benjamin Jekhowsky at the Algiers Observatory in North Africa. The asteroid was named after the secretary of the Faculty of Sciences of Paris, D. Tombecka.

== Orbit and classification ==
Tombecka is a member of the Mitidika family, a small asteroid family of carbonaceous asteroids in the central main belt named after 2262 Mitidika. It has also been described generically as a stony Eunomian asteroid (502).

The asteroid orbits the Sun in the central main-belt at a distance of 2.1–3.2 AU once every 4 years and 5 months (1,606 days). Its orbit has an eccentricity of 0.21 and an inclination of 12° with respect to the ecliptic. It was first identified as A905 UG at Heidelberg Observatory in October 1905. The body's observation arc begins at Heidelberg in 1931, approximately 7 years after its official discovery observation at Algiers.

== Naming ==
This minor planet was named after D. Tombeck, secretary of the Faculty of Sciences of Paris. The official naming citation was mentioned in The Names of the Minor Planets by Paul Herget in 1955 (H 97).

== Physical characteristics ==
=== Spectral type ===
Tombecka has been characterized as a metallic M-type asteroid by the Wide-field Infrared Survey Explorer (WISE). It has also been described as an Xk subtype, that transitions from the X-type to the K-type asteroids. In the Tholen classification, a determination of Tombecka's spectral type was inconclusive: numerical analysis of the asteroid's colors was closest to an X-type (which includes the M-type in this taxonomy), as well as in the vicinity of the C- and S-type asteroids.

=== Diameter and albedo ===
According to the surveys carried out by the Infrared Astronomical Satellite IRAS, the Japanese Akari satellite and the NEOWISE mission of NASA's WISE telescope, Tombecka measures between 31.93 and 36.62 kilometers in diameter and its surface has an albedo between 0.120 and 0.1552.

The Collaborative Asteroid Lightcurve Link adopts the results obtained by IRAS, that is, an albedo of 0.1552 and a diameter of 31.93 kilometers based on an absolute magnitude of 10.12.

=== Mass and density ===
Tombecka has a determined mass of (0.17±1.43)×10^{18} kilograms and a high (metallic) density of 7.50 g/cm^{3} with no porosity at all. The results correspond to an overall mean-diameter of 35.18 kilometers.

=== Rotation period and poles ===
In 1986, several rotational lightcurves of Tombecka were obtained from photometric observations. Lightcurve analysis gave a rotation period between 6.0 and 6.0508 hours with a brightness variation of 0.35 to 0.50 magnitude (U=3/3/3/3).

In 2006, an international study modeled a lightcurve with a concurring period of 6.05017 hours and determined a spin axis of (4.0°, 62.0°) in ecliptic coordinates (λ,β) (Q=2).
