= Jérôme Lejeune =

French pediatrician and geneticist (1926–1994)

Venerable Jérôme Lejeune
- Lejeune in 1973
- Born: 13 June 1926; Montrouge, Hauts-de-Seine, France
- Died: 3 April 1994 (aged 67); Paris, France
- Education: Collège Stanislas de Paris; Paris School of Medicine
- Spouse(s): Birthe Lejeune, née Bringsted
- Children: Clara Gaymard
- Awards: Joseph P. Kennedy, Jr. Foundation Award (1962); William Allan Award (1969); Leopold Griffuel Prize (1992)
- Scientific career
- Fields: Pediatrics; genetics
- Workplaces: French National Centre for Scientific Research; Faculté de Médecine de Paris; Pontifical Academy of Sciences; Académie des Sciences Morales et Politiques; Académie Nationale de Médecine; Pontifical Academy for Life

Jérôme Jean Louis Marie Lejeune (French pronunciation: [ʒeʁom ʒɑ̃ lwi maʁi ləʒœn]; 13 June 1926 – 3 April 1994) was a French pediatrician and geneticist. He is best known for his work on the links between chromosome abnormalities like Down syndrome (trisomy-21) and cri du chat syndrome. He is also known for his subsequent strong opposition to the use of amniocentesis prenatal testing for eugenic purposes through selective and elective abortion. He was declared Venerable by Pope Francis on 21 January 2021.

== Career ==
=== Trisomy 21 ===
In 1958, while working in Raymond Turpin’s laboratory with Marthe Gautier, Jérôme Lejeune reported that he had discovered that Down syndrome was caused by an extra copy of chromosome 21. According to Lejeune's laboratory notebooks, he made the observation demonstrating the link on 22 May 1958. The discovery was published by the French Academy of Sciences with Lejeune as first author, Gautier as second author, and Turpin as senior author. In 2009, co-author Gautier claimed that the discovery was based on fibroblast tissue samples that she had prepared and on which she noticed the discrepancy in chromosome count. This discovery was the first time that a defect in intellectual development was shown to be linked to chromosomal abnormalities.

==== Origins of the discovery ====
In the early 1950s, Lejeune joined the department headed by Turpin, who suggested that Lejeune focus his research on the causes of Down syndrome. As early as 1953, the two men showed a connection between an individual's characteristics and his or her dermatoglyphs–the fingerprints and lines on the hand. The structure of these lines, which remain the same throughout the individual's life, is determined during the earliest stages of embryo development. As Lejeune and Turpin studied the hands of children with Down syndrome, they deduced that their dermatoglyphic anomalies appeared during embryo formation.

In 1956, biologists from Lund University in Sweden announced that humans have exactly 46 chromosomes. Turpin had many years earlier proposed the idea of culturing cells to count the number of chromosomes in trisomy. Gautier had recently joined the pediatrics group he headed at the Armand-Trousseau Hospital, and she offered to attempt this, since she had been trained in both cell culture and tissue staining techniques in the United States. Turpin agreed to provide her with tissue samples from patients with Down syndrome. With very limited resources Gautier set up the first in vitro cell culture laboratory in France and discovered the chromosome discrepancy in tissue samples of trisomy patients.

At the time, the laboratories at the Armand-Trousseau hospital did not have a microscope capable of capturing images of the slides. Gautier entrusted her slides to Lejeune, a fellow researcher at CNRS, who offered to take pictures in another laboratory better equipped for this task. In August 1958 the photographs identified the supernumerary chromosome in patients with Down syndrome.

The laboratory notebook begun by Lejeune on 10 July 1957 indicates that on 22 May 1958 he succeeded in showing, for the first time, the presence of 47 chromosomes in a child with Down syndrome. This was two years after Tjio and Levan had proven that the human species has 46 chromosomes. On 13 June 1958, Lejeune identified an additional case, and a photo of the karyotype met with skeptical interest at the International Congress of Genetics in Montreal. The international community did not grasp the full impact of his discovery until 26 January 1959, when the French Academy of Sciences published the team's first paper presenting three case studies of children with Down syndrome.

In January 1959, by studying new cases and to forestall similar research by the English, the Trousseau laboratory announced the results of the analysis of the slides in the Proceedings of the Academy of Sciences through a paper published with Lejeune as first author, Gautier second (her surname misspelled as "Gauthier") and Turpin last author.

On 16 March 1959, another presentation to the Academy of Sciences confirmed the team's initial publication, this time covering nine cases. In April 1959, the English team of Brown and Jacobs corroborated these results, citing the initial January 1959 publication by Lejeune, Gautier, and Turpin. “Mongolism” had become trisomy 21. The discovery opened up a new field of investigation for modern genetics and laid the foundation for a new discipline: cytogenetics.

==== Dispute of the discovery ====
Gautier has criticized the portrayal of Lejeune as the sole discoverer of trisomy 21. She has stated in interviews and in a 2009 article in the journal Médecine/Sciences that she worked without assistance from Lejeune to develop the necessary cytological and histological resources and techniques, and used these to prepare microscope slides showing the trisomy. By her account, Lejeune took her slides away under the pretence of having them photographed for her, but instead presented them as his own work at a conference and in a subsequent publication. Jean-Marie Le Méné, president of the Jérôme Lejeune Foundation, maintains that there is no evidence that Gautier made the key discovery.

Gautier does not dispute that Lejeune identified the 47th chromosome as an extra copy of chromosome 21, but maintains that she was the first the notice the abnormal count. In a personal letter from 5 November 1958 to Gautier, Lejeune wrote appreciatively about her "preparations" that were instrumental to the discovery, and Gautier appeared as co-author on two seminal papers: one on the discovery of trisomy 21 and a second one about the cell culture techniques that Gautier had learned during a scholarship (1955–1956) at Harvard, Boston which made the discovery possible.

=== Later research and recognition ===
Continuing his work in genetics, Lejeune described several other diseases related to chromosomal abnormalities. In 1963 he identified Cri du Chat syndrome, caused by a missing segment in the short arm of chromosome 5, and in 1966 he described 18q-Syndrome, which results from loss of the distal portion of the long arm of chromosome 18. Lejeune also discovered the Dr phenotype (a malformation syndrome in which a ring-shaped chromosome replaces chromosome 13), and he identified trisomies on chromosome 9 in 1970 and chromosome 8 in 1971.

In a 1963 presentation before the French Academy of Sciences, Lejeune showed that monosomy—the absence of a specific segment of the genome—could also result in a clinically recognizable disease. Several years later, a group of American scientists came to Paris to conduct an independent investigation of Lejeune's discovery, and in 1962 the President of the United States personally presented him with the Kennedy Prize. In 1964, the first chair of human genetics was created at the Paris School of Medicine, and Lejeune was named to fill it. The appointment was highly unusual: only a groundbreaking discovery allowed a candidate to be named a professor of medicine without successfully completing a competitive residency examination.

In 1969, Lejeune's work earned him the William Allan Award from the American Society of Human Genetics. As of 2013 he was the only Frenchman to have won it.

=== Anti-abortion advocacy ===
Although Lejeune's discoveries paved the way for new therapeutic research into how changes in gene copy number could cause disease, they also led to the development of prenatal diagnosis of chromosome abnormalities and thence to abortions of affected pregnancies. This was very distressing to Lejeune, a devout Catholic, and led him to begin his fight for the anti-abortion cause.

Lejeune opposed the authorization in 1967 for women to use contraception as well as the Peyret laws in 1970 to render legal the interruption of pregnancy in case of fetal abnormalities. He also opposed the Veil Law ("Loi Veil" 1975) authorizing voluntary interruption of pregnancy.

After receiving the Allan prize, Lejeune gave a talk to his colleagues which concluded by explicitly questioning the morality of abortion, an unpopular viewpoint in the profession. In a letter to his wife, Lejeune wrote "today, I lost my Nobel prize in Medicine."

In 1975, after one of his public appearances in Paris on the beginning of life, Lejeune met Wanda Półtawska, director of the Catholic Institute for the Family in Kraków. Later that year, Półtawska contacted Lejeune twice, asking him to speak at conferences on the beginning of life that she was organizing with one of her close friends, Monsignor Karol Wojtyla, then Cardinal-Archbishop of Krakow. On 16 October 1978 Wojtyla was elected Pope John Paul II.

Afterward, Lejeune regularly traveled to Rome to meet with the pope, to attend meetings of the Pontifical Academy of Sciences, and to participate in other church events, such as the 1987 Synod of Bishops. The pope wanted to name Lejeune as the president of a new pontifical academy that was dear to his heart: the Pontifical Academy for Life. Lejeune painstakingly drafted its bylaws and the oath of the Servants of Life that each member of the academy must take. A few years later, during his visit to Paris for World Youth Day 1997, John Paul II visited Lejeune's grave in Châlo-Saint-Mars.

Lejeune was diagnosed with lung cancer in November 1993. Lejeune served as president of the Academy for only a few weeks before his death in April 1994.

== Beatification process ==
Lejeune was titled a Servant of God by the Catholic Church upon the opening of his cause for beatification, which is being postulated by a member of the Abbey of Saint Wandrille in France. On 21 January 2021, Pope Francis declared Lejeune's heroic virtue, and Lejeune was indicated venerable.

== Honors, awards and credentials ==
Jérôme Lejeune received many distinctions during his lifetime. He was a member of:

- the French Institute’s Academy of Moral and Political Sciences
- the French Academy of Medicine
- the Pontifical Academy of Sciences
- the Lyncean Academy in Rome
- the American Academy of Arts and Sciences
- the Royal Swedish Academy
- the National Academy of Medicine in Argentina
- the University of Santiago, Chile

Lejeune held honorary doctorates from:

- University of Düsseldorf, Germany
- University of Navarra, Spain
- University of Buenos Aires, Argentina
- Pontifical Catholic University of Chile

His international positions included:

- World Health Organization (WHO)

Consulting expert on human genetics (1962)

- International Commission on Radiological Protection

Committee member (1963)

- United Nations
  - French expert to the Scientific Committee on the Effects of Atomic Radiation

== Selected works ==
- Life is a Blessing by Clara Lejeune ISBN 978-0-935372-59-5
- The Concentration Can by Jérôme Lejeune ISBN 978-0-89870-394-8
- The Tiniest Humans by Robert L. Sassone, Jerome Lejeune, Albert W. Liley ISBN 1-890712-17-5
- Jérôme Lejeune by Anne Bernet ISBN 978-2-7509-0029-8
- Le Professeur Lejeune – Fondateur de la Génétique Moderne by Jean-Marie Le Méné ISBN 978-2-7289-0859-2

== See also ==
- List of lay Catholic scientists
- List of Christians in science and technology
