= Rothschild Hospital, Paris =

Hospital in France

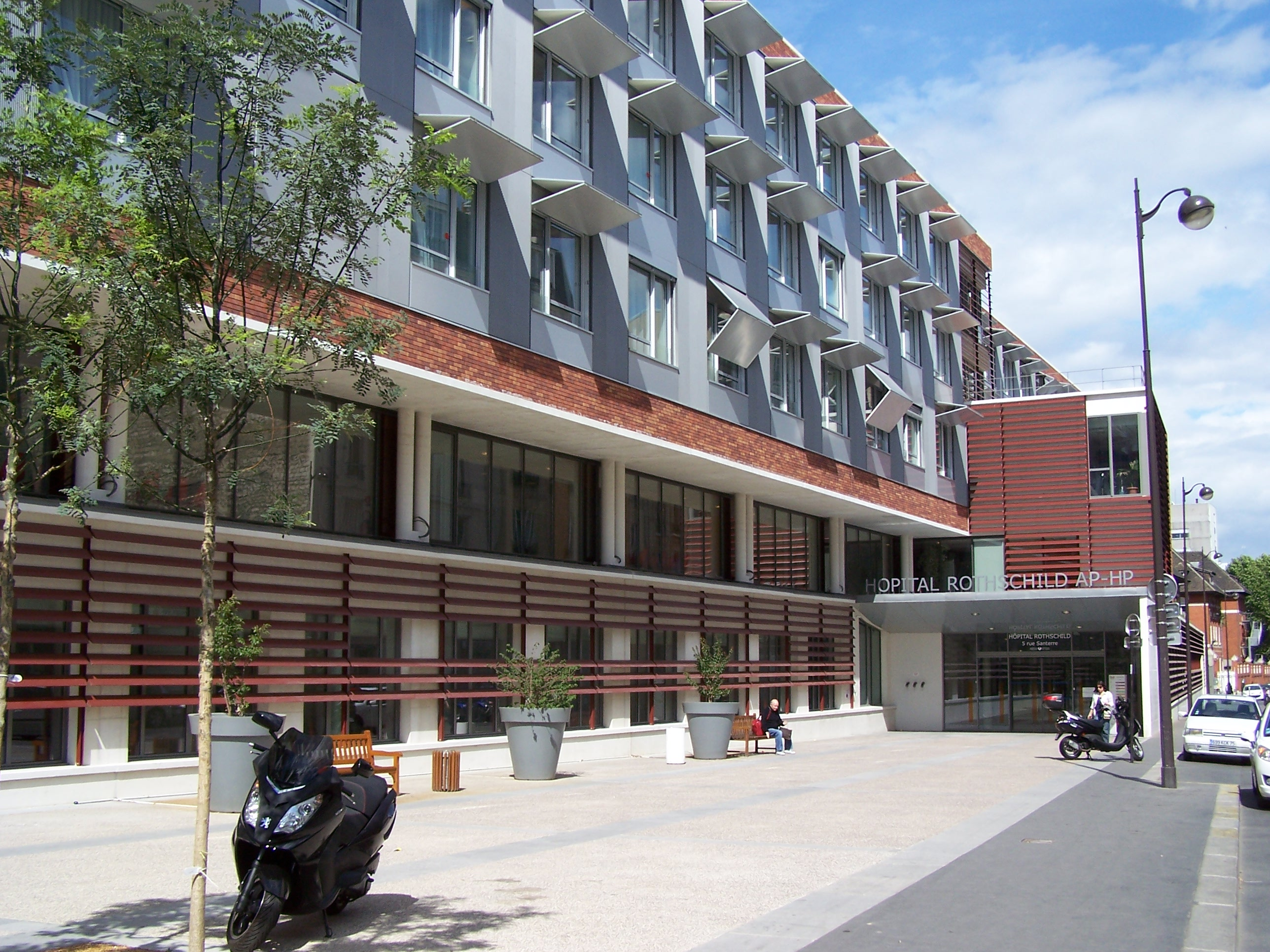
- Hospital entrance on 5 rue Santerre

Geography
- Location: 12th Arrondissement, Paris, France
- Coordinates: 48.843214°N 2.398418°E

Organisation
- Type: General

History
- Opened: mid-19th century

Links
- Lists: Hospitals in France

Rothschild Hospital is a hospital in the 12th arrondissement of Paris, operated by the Assistance Publique – Hôpitaux de Paris. Initially built to serve the Jewish community of East Paris, it specializes in geriatrics, physical therapy and rehabilitation as well as several different aspects of dentistry, notably periodontology and dental implants.

== History ==
In the middle of the 19th century, James de Rothschild founded a hospital at 76 rue de Picpus which included a Hospice for the elderly. The hospital opened on 25 May 1852 and was initially opened to treat and welcome Jewish patients.

On the initiative of Baron Edmond de Rothschild, the hospital received supplementary funds to build a new building on Rue Picpus. The building was completely reconstructed by architect Lucien Bechmann (1880–1968) between 1912 and 1914. The new Rothschild Hospital, situated on Rue Santerre opened its doors in 1914, a few meters from the former hospital, which was turned into a home for the elderly.

Declared a military auxiliary hospital during the First World War, it received wounded from the front and civilian victims regardless of their religious background. On 15 June 1918, the hospital was hit during a raid by German air forces.

At the end of the war, the hospital returned to its role as a hospital for Jewish patients.

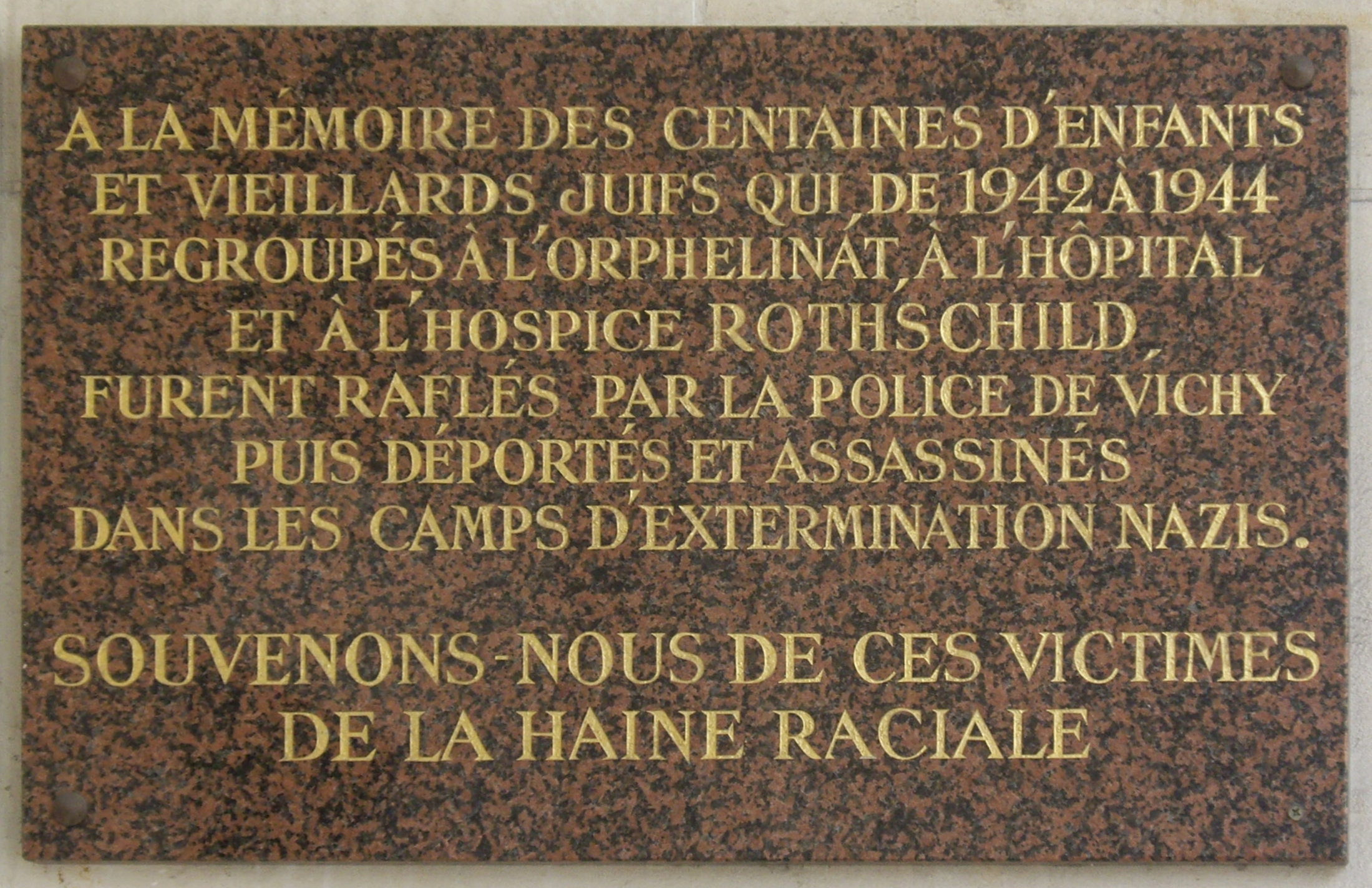
Commemorative plaque at the Rothschild Foundation, 76 rue de Picpus, 12th arrondissement

During the German occupation of France in World War II, it was placed under the control of Nazi occupying forces and used as a detention center. The hospital was called a "mousetrap": Jewish women who gave birth at the hospital would be required to register and surrender their children to the Gestapo immediately after birth. A resistance network was organized with the help of medical personnel in the hospital. Many children were declared stillborn to prevent the Nazis of being aware of their existence.

=== Rothschild as a Public Hospital ===
On 1 January 1954, after forty years of private management, the Rothschild family donated the hospital to the Paris public hospital system for the symbolic cost of one Franc.

Since then, the hospital building has been modified a number of times, with older sections being replaced with more modern buildings. Between 2009 and 2011, new buildings were added that are accessible from the main entrance at Rue Santerre. Their specialty also shifted to Gerontology and Rehabilitation

From its website, the hospital describes itself as:

The Rothschild Hospital is the referral hospital for disability, elderly needs and dentistry. It is integrated into a resolutely innovative architectural and technical framework

In 2013, an unused wing of the hospital served as the filming location for the film Hippocrate by Thomas Lilti. The movie presents the difficult situation facing public hospitals in France and the problems their personnel face.

== Notable staff ==
- Robert Debré, member of the medical council, 1937
- Arnold Netter, Professor and Gynecologist
- Max Jacob
- Madame Georges Getting, founder of the hospital social services division in 1930.
- René Wolfomm and Jean Dry, allergists, 1970–1980
- Léon Zadoc-Kahn, son of Chief Rabbi of France Zadoc Kahn, Chief Physician of the hospital, president of the central committee of Keren Hayessod France. He and his wife, Suzanne Zadoc-Kahn, were deported to Auschwitz, where they were killed upon arrival on 23 November 1943.

== Transit access ==
The hospital is accessible by Paris Métro Line 6 at Bel Air and Daumesnil/Felix Éboué stations, as well as on Paris Métro Line 8 at Daumesnil. By bus, the hospital is close to several RATP bus lines, including routes 29 56 64 .

== Notes and references ==
=== Bibliography ===
- Marine Lefèvre (1999). Chronique d'un hôpital pas comme les autres, Rothschild (1743–1999) (in French). Paris: Édition AP-HP. p. 111..
- Historique de l'hôpital Rothschild, Archives de l'AP-HP

=== Documentary ===
- Les Enfants juifs sauvés de l'hôpital Rothschild, 2017.

=== See also ===
- Moïse Cahen – Mayer Cahen – Colette Brull-Ulmann – Claire Heyman – Léon Zadoc-Kahn

=== External links ===
- Page de présentation de l'hôpital sur le site officiel de l'AP-HP
- Archives sur l'hôpital Rothschild, conservées par les Archives de l'AP-HP
