= 1037 Davidweilla =

Asteroid

Discovery
- Discovered by: B. Jekhovsky
- Discovery site: Algiers Obs.
- Discovery date: 29 October 1924

Designations
- Named after: David Weill
- Alternative designations: 1924 TF · 1951 TS; 1958 XG · 1975 XC_{5}
- Minor planet category: main-belt · (inner)

Orbital characteristics
- Epoch 4 September 2017 (JD 2458000.5)
- Uncertainty parameter 0
- Observation arc: 92.50 yr (33,787 days)
- Aphelion: 2.6862 AU
- Perihelion: 1.8245 AU
- Semi-major axis: 2.2554 AU
- Eccentricity: 0.1910
- Orbital period (sidereal): 3.39 yr (1,237 days)
- Mean anomaly: 172.40°
- Mean motion: 0° 17^{m} 27.6^{s} / day
- Inclination: 5.9015°
- Longitude of ascending node: 200.68°
- Argument of perihelion: 169.52°

Physical characteristics
- Dimensions: 6.884±0.174 km
- Geometric albedo: 0.130±0.017
- Absolute magnitude (H): 13.6

1037 Davidweilla, provisional designation 1924 TF, is an asteroid from the inner regions of the asteroid belt, approximately 7 kilometers in diameter. It was discovered on 29 October 1924, by Benjamin Jekhowsky at Algiers Observatory in Algeria, Northern Africa.

== Classification and orbit ==
Davidweilla orbits the Sun in the inner main-belt at a distance of 1.8–2.7 AU once every 3 years and 5 months (1,237 days). Its orbit has an eccentricity of 0.19 and an inclination of 6° with respect to the ecliptic. The body's observation arc begins with its official discovery observation at Algiers.

== Physical characteristics ==
=== Diameter and albedo ===
According to the survey carried out by the NEOWISE mission of NASA's Wide-field Infrared Survey Explorer, Davidweilla measures 6.884 kilometers in diameter and its surface has an albedo of 0.130.

=== Lightcurves ===
As of 2017, no rotational lightcurve of Davidweilla has been obtained. The body's rotation period and shape remain unknown.

== Naming ==
This minor planet was named after David Weill, at the Sorbonne University in Paris. He was a member of the Academy of sciences. The official naming citation was published by Paul Herget in The Names of the Minor Planets (H 99).
