= 1093 Freda =

Carbonaceous main-belt asteroid

Discovery
- Discovered by: B. Jekhovsky
- Discovery site: Algiers Obs.
- Discovery date: 15 June 1925

Designations
- Named after: Fred Prévost (French engineer)
- Alternative designations: 1925 LA · A898 VE
- Minor planet category: main-belt · (outer)

Orbital characteristics
- Epoch 4 September 2017 (JD 2458000.5)
- Uncertainty parameter 0
- Observation arc: 88.15 yr (32,198 days)
- Aphelion: 3.9776 AU
- Perihelion: 2.2809 AU
- Semi-major axis: 3.1293 AU
- Eccentricity: 0.2711
- Orbital period (sidereal): 5.54 yr (2,022 days)
- Mean anomaly: 175.72°
- Mean motion: 0° 10^{m} 41.16^{s} / day
- Inclination: 25.215°
- Longitude of ascending node: 55.635°
- Argument of perihelion: 251.42°

Physical characteristics
- Dimensions: 88.01±27.85 km 101.67±1.45 km 116.73±2.9 km 126.04±43.76 km
- Mass: (1.8±1.9)×10^{18} kg (Note: Calculated from its standard gravitational parameter GM = 0.12±0.13 km^{3}/s^{2}.) (SB441)
- Mean density: 1.7–5.0 g/cm^{3} (calculated)
- Synodic rotation period: 10.73±0.05 h 10.73±0.05 h 19.67±0.01 h (Note: Lightcurve plot of 1093 Freda, Palmer Divide Observatory, Brian D. Warner (2008). Summary figures for (1093) Freda at the LCDB); 19.701±0.0148 h
- Geometric albedo: 0.03±0.02; 0.0381±0.002; 0.051±0.002; 0.06±0.05
- Spectral type: Tholen = C B–V = 0.679; U–B = 0.356
- Absolute magnitude (H): 8.49±0.42 · 8.83 · 8.88 · 8.882±0.001 (R)

1093 Freda, provisional designation 1925 LA, is a carbonaceous asteroid from the outer regions of the asteroid belt's background population, approximately 110 kilometers in diameter. It was discovered on 15 June 1925, by astronomer Benjamin Jekhowsky at the Algiers Observatory in Algeria, North Africa. The asteroid was named after French engineer Fred Prévost.

== Orbit and classification ==
Freda is a non-family asteroid of the main belt's background population. It orbits the Sun in the outer main-belt at a distance of 2.3–4.0 AU once every 5 years and 6 months (2,022 days). Its orbit has an eccentricity of 0.27 and an inclination of 25° with respect to the ecliptic.

In November 1998, the asteroid was first identified as A898 VE at the Boyden Station of the Harvard Observatory in Peru. The body's observation arc begins at Yerkes Observatory in February 1929, almost four years after its official discovery observation at Algiers.

== Physical characteristics ==
In the Tholen classification, Freda is a common carbonaceous C-type asteroid.

=== Rotation period ===
Several rotational lightcurves of Freda were obtained from photometric observations by Brian Warner, Federico Manzini, and at the Palomar Transient Factory since 2007. Best-rated lightcurve analysis gave a rotation period of 19.67 hours with a brightness amplitude of 0.21 magnitude (U=3).

=== Diameter and albedo ===
According to the surveys carried out by the Infrared Astronomical Satellite IRAS, the Japanese Akari satellite and the NEOWISE mission of NASA's Wide-field Infrared Survey Explorer, Freda measures between 88.01 and 126.04 kilometers in diameter and its surface has an albedo between 0.03 and 0.06.

The Collaborative Asteroid Lightcurve Link adopts the results obtained by IRAS, that is, an albedo of 0.0381 and a diameter of 116.73 kilometers based on an absolute magnitude of 8.83.

== Naming ==
This minor planet was named after Fred Prévost, a French civil engineer of mines and benefactor of the Faculty of sciences of Bordeaux. The official naming citation was mentioned in The Names of the Minor Planets by Paul Herget in 1955 (H 103).
