= Marcel Lermoyez =

French otolaryngologist and surgeon (1858–1929)

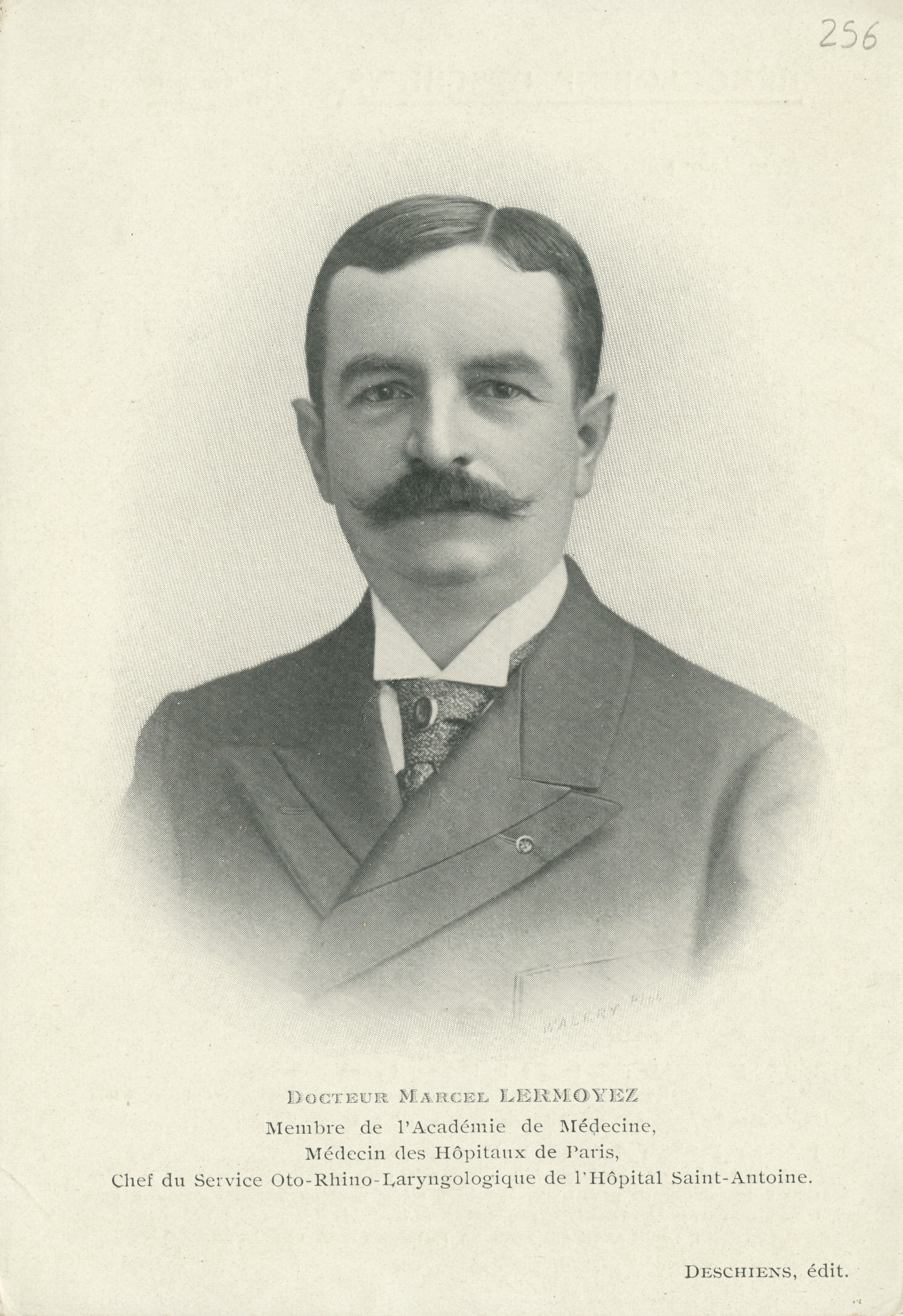
Marcel Lermoyez

Marcel Lermoyez (24 July 1858 – 1 February 1929) was a French otolaryngologist and surgeon who was a native of Cambrai.

== Background ==
In 1886, he received his doctorate in Paris, and from 1891 served as médecin des hôpitaux. The following year, he traveled to Vienna in order to study with famed otologist Adam Politzer (1835-1920). It was during this period of time that Lermoyez decided to specialize in the field of otorhinolaryngology. In 1896 he opened a private clinic in Paris, and two years later was appointed to the Hôpital Saint-Antoine, where he established an otolaryngology service.

In 1910 he became only the second otologist to be elected to the Académie de Médecine, the first being Prosper Ménière (1799-1862). After the death of his son Jacques from tuberculosis contracted during WWI in 1923, Lermoyez became completely withdrawn, remaining depressed until his death in 1929.

Marcel Lermoyez is credited for establishing otolaryngology as a specialized medical field in France. He made contributions in the research of diseases such as tuberculosis of the ear, otosclerosis, and otogenous meningitis.

== Written works ==
In 1894 he published Rhinologie, otologie, laryngologie: Enseignement et pratique de la Faculté de Médecine de Vienne, a book that was a catalyst towards the founding of the so-called "French School of Otolaryngology", and considered to be an important work in regards to the history of Viennese medicine. Other noteworthy publications by Lermoyez include:

- Étude expérimentale sur la phonation, 1886 - Experimental study of phonation.
- Le diagnostic de la méningite aiguë otogène, 1909 - The diagnosis of acute otogenic meningitis.
- Traité des affections de l'oreille, 1921 - Treatise on diseases of the ear.

In addition to his own writings, he made contributions to Charles-Joseph Bouchard's Traité de pathologie générale, Pierre Robin's Traité de thérapeutique appliquée and to Jacques-Joseph Grancher and Jules Comby's Traité des maladies de l'enfance. In 1892 he founded the journal Annales des Maladies des Oreilles et du Larynx.

== Associated eponym ==
- Lermoyez's syndrome: Tinnitus and loss of hearing prior to an attack of vertigo, after which hearing improves. It is considered a variant of labyrinth idropsy, similar to Ménière's disease. While Ménière's disease is chronic and progressive, Lermoyez's syndrome is an acute phenomenon which results in no damage for the ciliated cells of cochlea. This is possible because the excess of pressure inside the inner ear is reduced by a break of the sacculum, in the vestibular labyrinth, with no long term consequence for the cochlea.
