= 988 Appella =

Main-belt asteroid

Discovery
- Discovered by: B. Jekhovsky
- Discovery site: Algiers Obs.
- Discovery date: 10 November 1922

Designations
- Pronunciation: /əˈpɛlə/
- Named after: Paul Appell (French mathematician)
- Alternative designations: 1922 MT · 1955 QJ_{1}
- Minor planet category: main-belt · Themis

Orbital characteristics
- Epoch 16 February 2017 (JD 2457800.5)
- Uncertainty parameter 0
- Observation arc: 76.56 yr (27,964 days)
- Aphelion: 3.8829 AU
- Perihelion: 2.4017 AU
- Semi-major axis: 3.1423 AU
- Eccentricity: 0.2357
- Orbital period (sidereal): 5.57 yr (2,035 days)
- Mean anomaly: 308.57°
- Mean motion: 0° 10^{m} 36.84^{s} / day
- Inclination: 1.5748°
- Longitude of ascending node: 41.726°
- Argument of perihelion: 337.28°

Physical characteristics
- Dimensions: 20.431±0.215 km 20.44±0.33 km 21.7±2.2 km 22±2 km 25.77 km (derived); 25.91±1.2 km (IRAS:18); 30.09±0.37 km
- Synodic rotation period: 7.0±1.0 h (dated); 120 h
- Geometric albedo: 0.0609 (derived); 0.066±0.002; 0.08±0.02; 0.0871±0.009 (IRAS:18); 0.09±0.02; 0.097±0.021; 0.1401±0.0208
- Spectral type: S
- Absolute magnitude (H): 11.2 · 11.50 · 11.50±0.27 · 11.60

988 Appella, provisional designation 1922 MT, is a dark Themistian asteroid and slow rotator from the outer region of the asteroid belt, approximately 26 kilometers in diameter. It was discovered on 10 November 1922, by Russian–French astronomer Benjamin Jekhowsky at Algiers Observatory in Algeria, North Africa. The asteroid was later named after French mathematician Paul Émile Appel.

== Classification and orbit ==
Appella is a member of the Themis family, a dynamical family of outer-belt asteroids with nearly coplanar ecliptical orbits. It orbits the Sun at a distance of 2.4–3.9 AU once every 5 years and 7 months (2,035 days). Its orbit has an eccentricity of 0.24 and an inclination of 2° with respect to the ecliptic.

The Minor Planet Center's first recorded astrometric observation is from Simeiz Observatory in 1933. The body's observation arc begins at Uccle Observatory in 1939, or 17 years after its official discovery observation at Algiers.

== Physical characteristics ==
In 2012, a rotational lightcurve of Appella was obtained from photometric observations by American astronomer Robert Stephens at the Santana Observatory (646) in California. It gave a long rotation period of 120 hours with a brightness amplitude of 0.4 in magnitude, rendering a tentative 2006-observation by Italian astronomers Roberto Crippa and Federico Manzini obsolete. This makes Appella one of a few hundreds slow rotator with a period above 100 hours.

According to the surveys carried out by the Infrared Astronomical Satellite IRAS, the Japanese Akari satellite, and NASA's Wide-field Infrared Survey Explorer with its NEOWISE mission, Appella measures between 20.431 and 30.09 kilometers in diameter, and its surface has an albedo from 0.066 to 0.1401.

The Collaborative Asteroid Lightcurve Link (CALL) derives an albedo of 0.0609 and a diameter of 25.77 kilometers with an absolute magnitude of 11.60. Although the figures are in accordance with the space-based surveys, CALL classifies Appella as a stony S-type rather than a carbonaceous C-type asteroid.

== Naming ==
This minor planet was named in honor of French mathematician Paul Émile Appel (1855–1930), president of the Academy of Sciences and of the Société Astronomique de France, and the author of Traité de Mécanique Rationelle published in 1893. The official naming citation was first published by Paul Herget in The Names of the Minor Planets in 1955 (H 94).
