= 953 Painleva =

Main-belt asteroid

Discovery
- Discovered by: B. Jekhovsky
- Discovery site: Algiers
- Discovery date: 29 April 1921

Designations
- Alternative designations: 1921 JT

Orbital characteristics
- Epoch 31 July 2016 (JD 2457600.5)
- Uncertainty parameter 0
- Observation arc: 88.30 yr (32251 days)
- Aphelion: 3.3166 AU (496.16 Gm)
- Perihelion: 2.2559 AU (337.48 Gm)
- Semi-major axis: 2.7863 AU (416.82 Gm)
- Eccentricity: 0.19033
- Orbital period (sidereal): 4.65 yr (1698.8 d)
- Mean anomaly: 106.695°
- Mean motion: 0° 12^{m} 42.912^{s} / day
- Inclination: 8.6667°
- Longitude of ascending node: 36.431°
- Argument of perihelion: 259.972°

Physical characteristics
- Mean radius: 14.165±0.55 km
- Synodic rotation period: 7.389 h (0.3079 d)
- Geometric albedo: 0.1670±0.013
- Absolute magnitude (H): 10.1

953 Painleva is a minor planet orbiting the Sun. It was discovered on 29 April 1921 by the Russian astronomer Benjamin Jekhowsky. The planet was named in honor of the French statesman and mathematician Paul Painlevé.
