= 977 Philippa =

Large background asteroid

Discovery
- Discovered by: B. Jekhovsky
- Discovery site: Algiers Obs.
- Discovery date: 6 April 1922

Designations
- Named after: Philippe de Rothschild (French financier)
- Alternative designations: A922 GA · 1922 LV; A914 YA · 1914 YA; A919 XA · 1919 XA
- Minor planet category: main-belt · (outer) background

Orbital characteristics
- Epoch 31 May 2020 (JD 2459000.5)
- Uncertainty parameter 0
- Observation arc: 105.05 yr (38,370 d)
- Aphelion: 3.1990 AU
- Perihelion: 3.0366 AU
- Semi-major axis: 3.1178 AU
- Eccentricity: 0.0260
- Orbital period (sidereal): 5.51 yr (2,011 d)
- Mean anomaly: 355.29°
- Mean motion: 0° 10^{m} 44.4^{s} / day
- Inclination: 15.174°
- Longitude of ascending node: 75.739°
- Argument of perihelion: 72.694°

Physical characteristics
- Mean diameter: 65.471±0.237 km; 65.67±5.3 km; 65.92±0.94 km
- Synodic rotation period: 15.405±0.005 h (Note: Lightcurve plot of (977) Philippa , Palmer Divide Observatory, B. D. Warner (2004) rotation period 15.405±0.005 hours with a brightness amplitude of 0.49±0.02 mag. Quality code of 3. Summary figures at the LCDB.)
- Geometric albedo: 0.051±0.005; 0.0555±0.010; 0.056±0.002
- Spectral type: Tholen = C; X (S3OS2); B–V = 0.712±0.010; U–B = 0.370±0.020
- Absolute magnitude (H): 9.9

977 Philippa (prov. designation: A922 GA or 1922 LV) is a large background asteroid from the outer regions of the asteroid belt, approximately 65 kilometers (40 miles) in diameter. It was discovered on 6 April 1922, by Russian–French astronomer Benjamin Jekhowsky at the Algiers Observatory in Northern Africa. The C-type asteroid is likely irregular in shape and has a rotation period of 15.4 hours. It was named after French financier Baron Philippe de Rothschild (1902–1988).

== Orbit and classification ==
Philippa is a non-family asteroid of the main belt's background population when applying the hierarchical clustering method to its proper orbital elements. It orbits the Sun in the outer asteroid belt at a distance of 3.0–3.2 AU once every 5 years and 6 months (2,011 days; semi-major axis of 3.12 AU). Its orbit has an eccentricity of 0.03 and an inclination of 15° with respect to the ecliptic.

The asteroid was first observed as A914 YA (1914 YA) at Heidelberg Observatory in December 1912. The body's observation arc begins at Vienna Observatory on 1 May 1922, or one month after its official discovery observation at Algiers.

== Naming ==
This minor planet was named after French financier Baron Philippe de Rothschild (1902–1988). The official naming citation was mentioned in The Names of the Minor Planets by Paul Herget in 1955 (H 94).

== Physical characteristics ==
In the Tholen classification-SMASS classification, Philippa is a common carbonaceous C-type asteroid, while in both the Tholen- and SMASS-like taxonomy of the Small Solar System Objects Spectroscopic Survey (S3OS2), the asteroid is an X-type.

=== Rotation period ===
In April 2004, a rotational lightcurve of Philippa was obtained from photometric observations by Brian Warner at the Palmer Divide Observatory in Colorado. Analysis of the classical bimodal lightcurve gave a rotation period of 15.405±0.005 hours with a high brightness amplitude of 0.49±0.02 magnitude, indicative of an irregular, non-spherical shape (U=3)

=== Diameter and albedo ===
According to the survey carried out by the Infrared Astronomical Satellite IRAS, the Japanese Akari satellite, and the NEOWISE mission of NASA's Wide-field Infrared Survey Explorer, Philippa measures between 65.4 and 65.9 kilometers in diameter and its surface has an albedo between 0.05 and 0.06. The Collaborative Asteroid Lightcurve Link adopts the results from IRAS, that is, an albedo of 0.0555 and a diameter of 65.67 kilometers based on an absolute magnitude of 9.67. In April 2014, Philippa was also subject to an asteroid occultation, timed observations when the asteroid passes in front of a distant star. The measurements gave an estimated diameter of 65 kilometers.
