= 1017 Jacqueline =

Main-belt asteroid

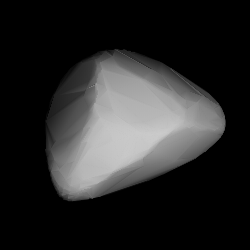
- Shape model of Jacqueline from its lightcurve

Discovery
- Discovered by: B. Jekhovsky
- Discovery site: Algiers Obs.
- Discovery date: 4 February 1924

Designations
- Named after: Jacqueline Zadoc-Kahn Eisenmann (discoverer's pupil)
- Alternative designations: 1924 QL · 1929 LG; 1953 AC · A924 ED; A924 CH
- Minor planet category: main-belt · (middle); background

Orbital characteristics
- Epoch 31 May 2020 (JD 2459000.5)
- Uncertainty parameter 0
- Observation arc: 92.01 yr (33,607 d)
- Aphelion: 2.8098 AU
- Perihelion: 2.4017 AU
- Semi-major axis: 2.6058 AU
- Eccentricity: 0.0783
- Orbital period (sidereal): 4.21 yr (1,536 d)
- Mean anomaly: 292.84°
- Mean motion: 0° 14^{m} 3.48^{s} / day
- Inclination: 7.9280°
- Longitude of ascending node: 118.94°
- Argument of perihelion: 68.145°

Physical characteristics
- Mean diameter: 37.65±3.4 km; 38.87±0.51 km; 40.152±0.199 km
- Synodic rotation period: 7.87±0.01 h
- Pole ecliptic latitude: (7.0°, 55.0°) (λ_{1}/β_{1}); (170.0°, 65.0°) (λ_{2}/β_{2})
- Geometric albedo: 0.051±0.002; 0.052±0.005; 0.0544±0.011
- Spectral type: SMASS = C
- Absolute magnitude (H): 11.1

1017 Jacqueline (prov. designation: A924 CH or 1924 QL) is a dark background asteroid from the central regions of the asteroid belt. It was discovered on 4 February 1924, by Russian-French astronomer Benjamin Jekhowsky at the Algiers Observatory, Algeria, in North Africa. The carbonaceous C-type asteroid has a rotation period of 7.87 hours with a high brightness amplitude of 0.6 magnitude and measures approximately 39 kilometers (24 miles) in diameter. It was named after the French physicist and long-time pupil of the discoverer, Jacqueline Zadoc-Kahn Eisenmann (1904–1998).

== Orbit and classification ==
Jacqueline is a non-family asteroid of the main belt's background population when applying the hierarchical clustering method to its proper orbital elements. It orbits the Sun in the intermediate asteroid belt at a distance of 2.4–2.8 AU once every 4 years and 3 months (1,536 days; semi-major axis of 2.61 AU). Its orbit has an eccentricity of 0.08 and an inclination of 8° with respect to the ecliptic. The asteroid's earliest preserved observation dates back to 7 March 1924 at Heidelberg Observatory, where the body's observation arc begins in February 1928, nearly four years after its official discovery observation at Algiers–Bouzaréah.

== Naming ==
This minor planet was named after Jacqueline Zadoc-Kahn Eisenmann (1904–1998), a French physicist and long-time student of Jekhowsky's. The naming was mentioned in The Names of the Minor Planets by Paul Herget in 1955 (H 97).

== Physical characteristics ==
In the Bus–Binzel SMASS classification, Jacqueline is a common, carbonaceous C-type asteroid.

=== Rotation period ===
In May 2000, a rotational lightcurve of Jacqueline was obtained from photometric observations by American photometrist Robert Stephens at the Santana Observatory (646) in California. Analysis of the classically shaped bimodal lightcurve gave a well-defined rotation period of 7.87±0.01 hours and a brightness variation of 0.6±0.02 magnitude, indicative of a non-spheroidal shape (U=3). Other measurements by Eric Barbotin and by astronomers at the Palomar Transient Factory gave a similar period of 7.873 and 7.875 hours with an amplitude of 0.72 and 0.43 magnitude, respectively (U=3-/2).

In 2016, a lightcurve was published using modeled photometric data from the Lowell Photometric Database. It gave a concurring sidereal period of 7.87149 hours, as well as two spin axes of (7.0°, 55.0°) and (170.0°, 65.0°) in ecliptic coordinates (λ, β).

=== Diameter and albedo ===
According to the surveys carried out by the Infrared Astronomical Satellite IRAS, the Japanese Akari satellite and the NEOWISE mission of NASA's Wide-field Infrared Survey Explorer, Jacqueline measures (37.65±3.4), (38.87±0.51) and (40.152±0.199) kilometers in diameter and its surface has an albedo of (0.0544±0.011), (0.051±0.002) and (0.052±0.005), respectively. The Collaborative Asteroid Lightcurve Link derives an albedo of 0.0497 and a diameter of 37.61 kilometers based on an absolute magnitude of 11.0.

Alternative mean-diameter measurements published by the WISE team include (29.523±10.14 km), (30.09±11.84 km), (31.991±0.454 km), (32.631±9.058 km) and (45.056±0.325 km) with corresponding albedos of (0.0670±0.0538), (0.07±0.06), (0.069±0.012), (0.06±0.02) and (0.0380±0.0053).
