= 976 Benjamina =

Main-belt asteroid

Discovery
- Discovered by: B. Jekhovsky
- Discovery site: Algiers Obs.
- Discovery date: 27 March 1922

Designations
- Named after: Benjamin Jekhowsky Jr. (discoverer's son)
- Alternative designations: A922 FD · A910 AB; 1922 LU · 1910 AB
- Minor planet category: main-belt · (outer) background

Orbital characteristics
- Epoch 31 May 2020 (JD 2459000.5)
- Uncertainty parameter 0
- Observation arc: 109.34 yr (39,935 d)
- Aphelion: 3.5276 AU
- Perihelion: 2.8744 AU
- Semi-major axis: 3.2010 AU
- Eccentricity: 0.1020
- Orbital period (sidereal): 5.73 yr (2,092 d)
- Mean anomaly: 43.757°
- Mean motion: 0° 10^{m} 19.56^{s} / day
- Inclination: 7.7121°
- Longitude of ascending node: 243.76°
- Argument of perihelion: 319.60°

Physical characteristics
- Mean diameter: 79.94±1.16 km; 80.53±2.5 km; 83.195±0.542 km
- Synodic rotation period: 9.701±0.002 h
- Pole ecliptic latitude: (354.0°, 80.0°) (λ_{1}/β_{1})
- Geometric albedo: 0.052±0.006; 0.0559±0.004; 0.057±0.002
- Spectral type: Tholen = XD: B–V = 0.740±0.020; U–B = 0.250±0.030
- Absolute magnitude (H): 9.3

976 Benjamina (prov. designation: A922 FD or 1922 LU) is a dark background asteroid from the outer regions of the asteroid belt, approximately 81 kilometers (50 miles) in diameter. It was discovered on 27 March 1922, by Russian-French astronomer Benjamin Jekhowsky at the Algiers Observatory in North Africa. The large X/D-type asteroid has a rotation period of 9.7 hours and is likely regular in shape. It was named after the discoverer's son.

== Orbit and classification ==
Benjamina is a non-family asteroid of the main belt's background population when applying the hierarchical clustering method to its proper orbital elements. It orbits the Sun in the outer main-belt at a distance of 2.9–3.5 AU once every 5 years and 9 months (2,092 days; semi-major axis of 3.2 AU). Its orbit has an eccentricity of 0.10 and an inclination of 8° with respect to the ecliptic.

The asteroid was first observed as A910 AB (1910 AB) at Heidelberg Observatory on 8 January 1910. The body's observation arc begins at the Crimean Simeiz Observatory in September 1930, more than 7 years after its official discovery observation at Algiers Observatory in March 1922.

== Naming ==
This minor planet was named after Benjamin Jekhowsky Jr., son of discoverer Benjamin Jekhowsky. The naming was mentioned in The Names of the Minor Planets by Paul Herget in 1955 (H 93).

== Physical characteristics ==
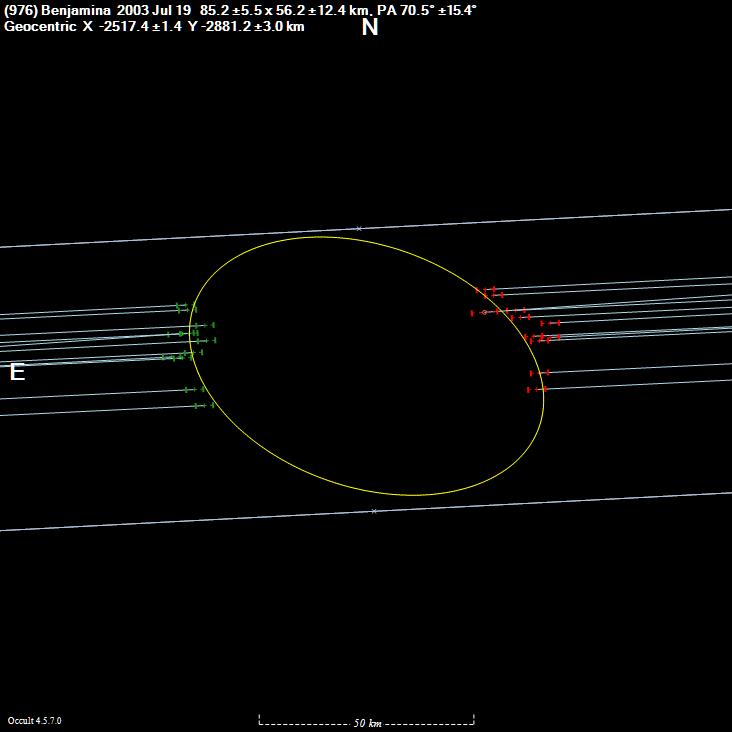
An 11 Chord plot of the occultation by Benjamina observed on 19 July 2003 from sites in Australia, New Zealand and Argentina.

In the Tholen classification, and based on a noisy spectra (:), Benjamina is an X-type asteroid, somewhat similar to that of a dark D-type (XD), which are common in the outer asteroid belt and among the Jupiter trojan population.

=== Rotation period and pole ===
In September 2004, a rotational lightcurve of Benjamina was obtained from photometric observations by French amateur astronomer Laurent Bernasconi. Lightcurve analysis gave a well-defined rotation period of 9.701±0.002 hours with a brightness variation of 0.19±0.01 magnitude (U=3). Follow-up observation by his college René Roy in March 2018, determined a concurring period of 9.705±0.003 hours but with a much higher amplitude of 0.60±0.10 magnitude (U=2). The objects first lightcurve was obtained by Colin Bembrick at Mount Tarana Observatory (431) in Australia in March 2003. It showed a period of 9.746±0.003 hours with an amplitude of 0.18±0.02 magnitude (U=2). The overall amplitude suggest a rather regular shape with a ratio of 0.86 for the length of the a and b axes.

In 2018, Czech astronomers Josef Ďurech and Josef Hanuš published a modeled lightcurve using photometric data from the Gaia probe's second data release. It showed a sidereal period of 9.7080±0.0002 hours, and gave a spin axis at (354.0°, 80.0°) in ecliptic coordinates (λ, β).

=== Diameter and albedo ===
According to the surveys carried out by the Japanese Akari satellite, the Infrared Astronomical Satellite IRAS, and the NEOWISE mission of NASA's Wide-field Infrared Survey Explorer (WISE), Benjamina measures 79.94±1.16, 80.53±2.5 and 83.195±0.542 kilometers in diameter with an albedo of its surface of 0.057±0.002, 0.0559±0.004 and 0.052±0.006, respectively. Additional measurements by the WISE telescope were published giving a mean-diameter as low as 71.372±27.828 km, and as high as 85.251±1.364 km.

The Collaborative Asteroid Lightcurve Link adopts the result from IRAS, that is, an albedo of 0.0559 and a diameter of 80.53 kilometers based on an absolute magnitude of 9.22.

The asteroid had been observed in 7 stellar occultation events since 2003. On 19 July 2003 the mag. 5.7 star HIP 88816 was occulted by the asteroid, and was observed at 11 stations; 1 in Argentina, 3 in New Zealand, and 7 in Australia. From these observations, the best-fit ellipse measures 85.2 x 56.2 ±12.4 kilometres.
