= Hôpital Saint-Antoine =

Hospital in Paris, France

Coordinates: 48.8485623°N 2.3824305°E

- AP-HP Sorbonne University Hospital Group
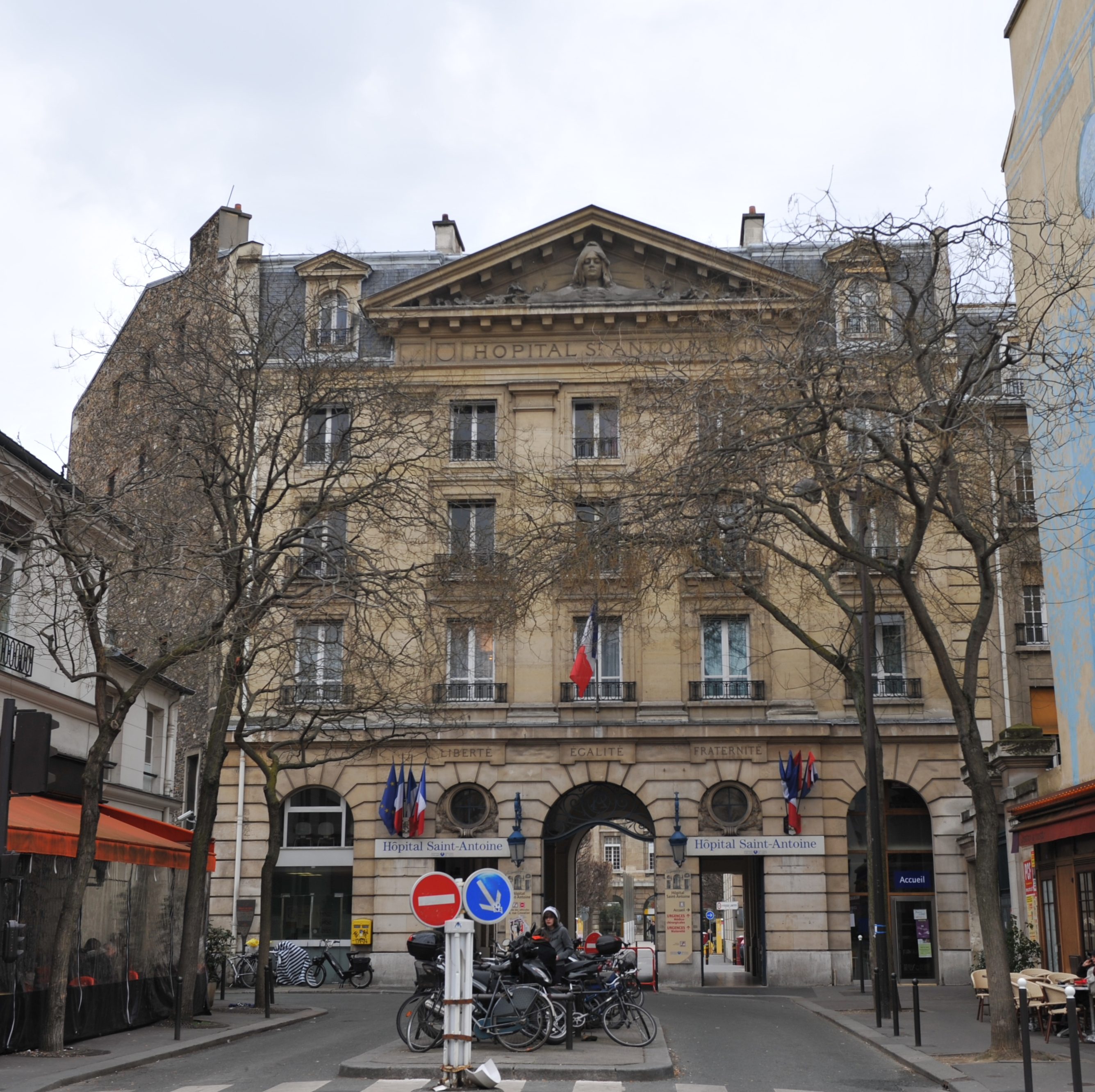
- Entrance of the Hôpital Saint-Antoine
- Location of the Hôpital Saint-Antoine within Paris

Geography
- Location: 184 Rue du Faubourg Saint-Antoine, 75012 Paris, France

Organisation
- Care system: Public
- Type: Teaching

Services
- Emergency department: Yes

Links
- Website: https://saintantoine.aphp.fr
- Lists: Hospitals in France

Hôpital Saint-Antoine (French pronunciation: [opital sɛ̃t‿ɑ̃twan]) is a university hospital of the Assistance Publique–Hôpitaux de Paris (AP-HP) located in the 12th arrondissement of Paris at 184, rue du Faubourg-Saint-Antoine. It is part of the AP-HP Sorbonne University Hospital Group.

During the COVID-19 pandemic, the Saint-Antoine hospital participated in therapeutic research, in particular the Corimuno-plasm (plasma therapy) clinical trial, with Karine Lacombe's team.
