= Hôpital Armand-Trousseau =

- Assistance publique - Hôpitaux de Paris
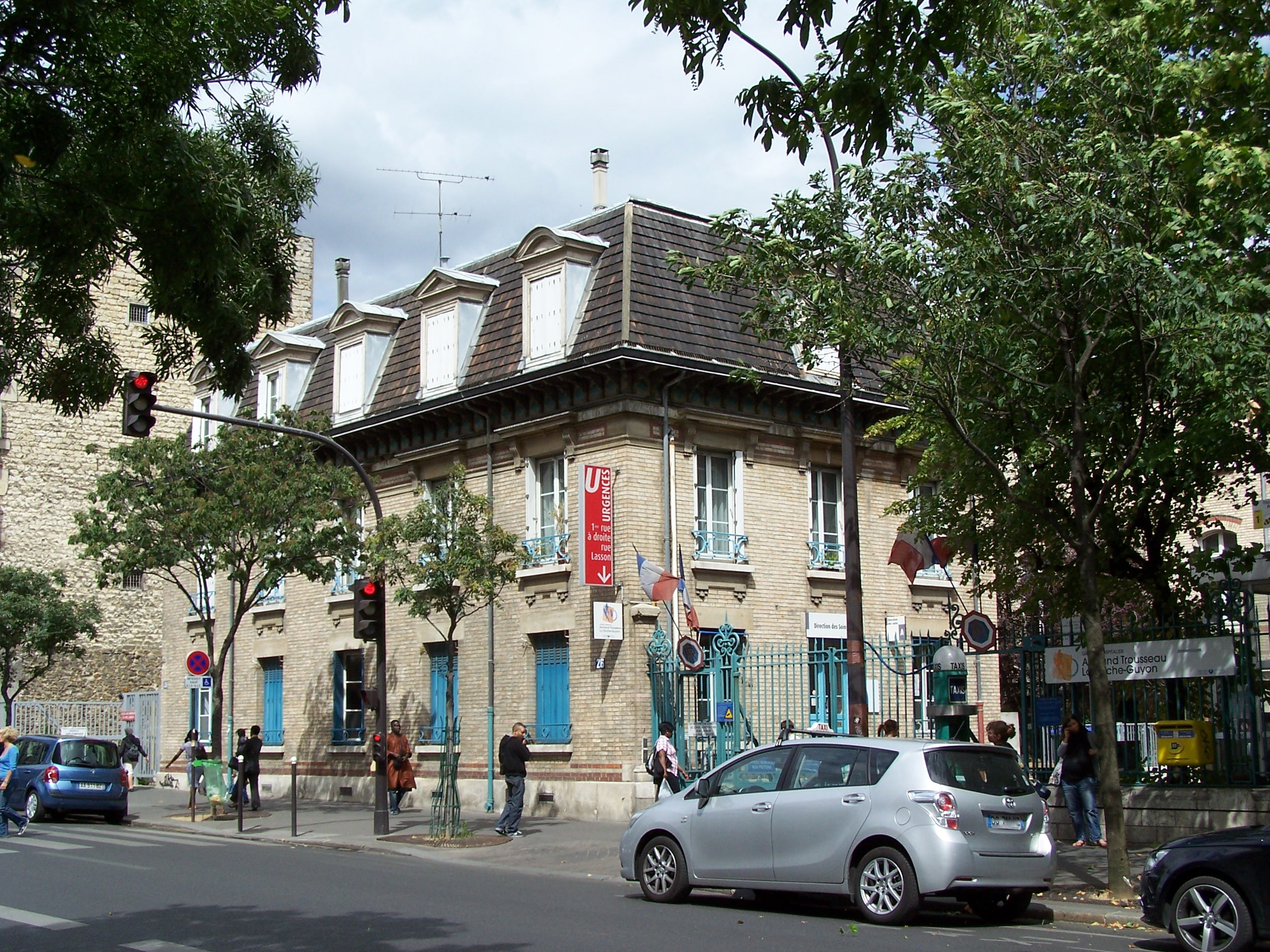

Geography
- Location: 12th arrondissement, Paris, France
- Coordinates: 48°50′31″N 2°24′24″E

Organisation
- Affiliated university: Sorbonne University

History
- Opened: 1901

Links
- Website: trousseau.aphp.fr
- Lists: Hospitals in France

The Hôpital Armand-Trousseau is a public Assistance Publique–Hôpitaux de Paris (AP-HP) located at 26, avenue du Docteur-Arnold-Netter and rue Lasson (entrance to the emergency room) in the 12th arrondissement of Paris. It is one of the sites of the Sorbonne University Hospital Group.

The hospital specializes in pediatric care and, since January 2006, multiple disabilities after its merger with the La Roche-Guyon hospital located in Val-d'Oise.
