= Benjamin Jekhowsky =

Russian–French astronomer

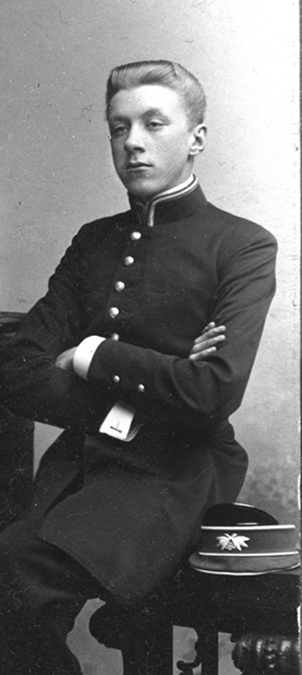
Benjamin Jekhowsky

Asteroids discovered: 12
953 Painleva	April 29, 1921	MPC
976 Benjamina	March 27, 1922	MPC
977 Philippa	April 6, 1922	MPC
988 Appella	November 10, 1922	MPC
1013 Tombecka	January 17, 1924	MPC
1017 Jacqueline	February 4, 1924	MPC
1037 Davidweilla	October 29, 1924	MPC
1040 Klumpkea	January 20, 1925	MPC
1093 Freda	June 15, 1925	MPC
1181 Lilith	February 11, 1927	MPC
1328 Devota	October 21, 1925	MPC
3881 Doumergua	November 15, 1925	MPC

Benjamin Jekhowsky (Russian: Вениамин Павлович Жеховский; born 1881 in Saint-Petersburg, Russia – died in 1975, Encausse-les-Thermes, France) was a Russian-French astronomer, born in Saint-Petersburg in a noble family of a Russian railroad official.

After attending Moscow University, he worked at the Paris Observatory beginning in 1912. Later he worked at the Algiers Observatory (at the time, Algeria was a colony of France), where he became known as a specialist in celestial mechanics. After 1934, he appears to have begun signing scientific articles as Benjamin de Jekhowsky. The Minor Planet Center credits his discoveries under the name "B. Jekhovsky" (with a v). In modern English transliteration, his name would be written as Zhekhovskii or Zhekhovsky.

He discovered 12 numbered minor planets, made more than 190 scientific publications and the asteroid 1606 Jekhovsky is named after him.
