= 1328 Devota =

Asteroid

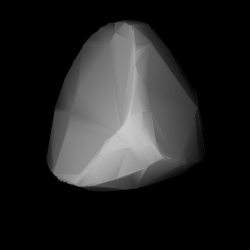
- Modelled shape of Devota from its lightcurve

Discovery
- Discovered by: B. Jekhovsky
- Discovery site: Algiers Obs.
- Discovery date: 21 October 1925

Designations
- Named after: Fortunato Devoto (Argentine astronomer)
- Alternative designations: 1925 UA · 1938 UC; 1951 TQ · 1951 TT; 1964 UD
- Minor planet category: main-belt · (outer) background

Orbital characteristics
- Epoch 4 September 2017 (JD 2458000.5)
- Uncertainty parameter 0
- Observation arc: 92.02 yr (33,612 days)
- Aphelion: 3.9778 AU
- Perihelion: 3.0334 AU
- Semi-major axis: 3.5056 AU
- Eccentricity: 0.1347
- Orbital period (sidereal): 6.56 yr (2,397 days)
- Mean anomaly: 13.874°
- Mean motion: 0° 9^{m} 0.72^{s} / day
- Inclination: 5.7658°
- Longitude of ascending node: 222.69°
- Argument of perihelion: 174.63°

Physical characteristics
- Dimensions: 53.697±0.481 km 55.288±0.434 km 56.06±0.91 km 57.11±5.1 km
- Synodic rotation period: 17.49±0.01 h
- Geometric albedo: 0.0407±0.008; 0.043±0.002; 0.0434±0.0064; 0.046±0.005
- Spectral type: Tholen = X P · D B–V = 0.695; U–B = 0.210
- Absolute magnitude (H): 10.09±0.25 · 10.31

1328 Devota, provisional designation 1925 UA, is a dark background asteroid from the outermost regions of the asteroid belt, approximately 56 kilometers in diameter. It was discovered on 21 October 1925, by Russian–French astronomer Benjamin Jekhowsky at the Algiers Observatory in North Africa. The asteroid was named after Argentine astronomer Fortunato Devoto.

== Orbit and classification ==
Devota is a non-family asteroid from the main belt's background population. It orbits the Sun in the outermost asteroid belt at a distance of 3.0–4.0 AU once every 6 years and 7 months (2,397 days; semi-major axis of 3.51 AU). Its orbit has an eccentricity of 0.13 and an inclination of 6° with respect to the ecliptic. The body's observation arc begins at Algiers, three nights after its official discovery observation.

== Physical characteristics ==
In the Tholen classification, Devota is an X-type asteroid, while the Wide-field Infrared Survey Explorer (WISE) characterized it as a primitive P-type. Other spectroscopic and photometric surveys as well as the Bus–DeMeo taxonomy classified the asteroid as a D-type due to its low albedo value and its featureless and reddish spectrum.

=== Rotation period ===
In August 2009, a rotational lightcurve of Devota was obtained from photometric observations by French amateur astronomer Pierre Antonini. Lightcurve analysis gave a rotation period of 17.49 hours with a brightness amplitude of 0.20 magnitude (U=2-). The observer also notes that there are several other possible period solutions ("plusieurs solutions entre 0.6 et 1 jour"). As of 2017, no secure period has been obtained.

=== Diameter and albedo ===
According to the surveys carried out by the Japanese Akari satellite and the NEOWISE mission of NASA's WISE telescope, Devota measures between 53.697 and 56.06 kilometers in diameter and its surface has an albedo between 0.043 and 0.046.

The Collaborative Asteroid Lightcurve Link adopts the results obtained by IRAS, that is, an albedo of 0.0407 and a diameter of 57.11 kilometers based on an absolute magnitude of 10.31.

== Naming ==
This minor planet was named by the discoverer after his friend, the Argentine astronomer Fortunato Devoto, who was the discoverer of the La Plata Observatory and president of the National Council of Observatories of Argentina. The official naming citation was mentioned in The Names of the Minor Planets by Paul Herget in 1955 (H 121).
