= Zadoc Kahn =

French rabbi 1839–1905

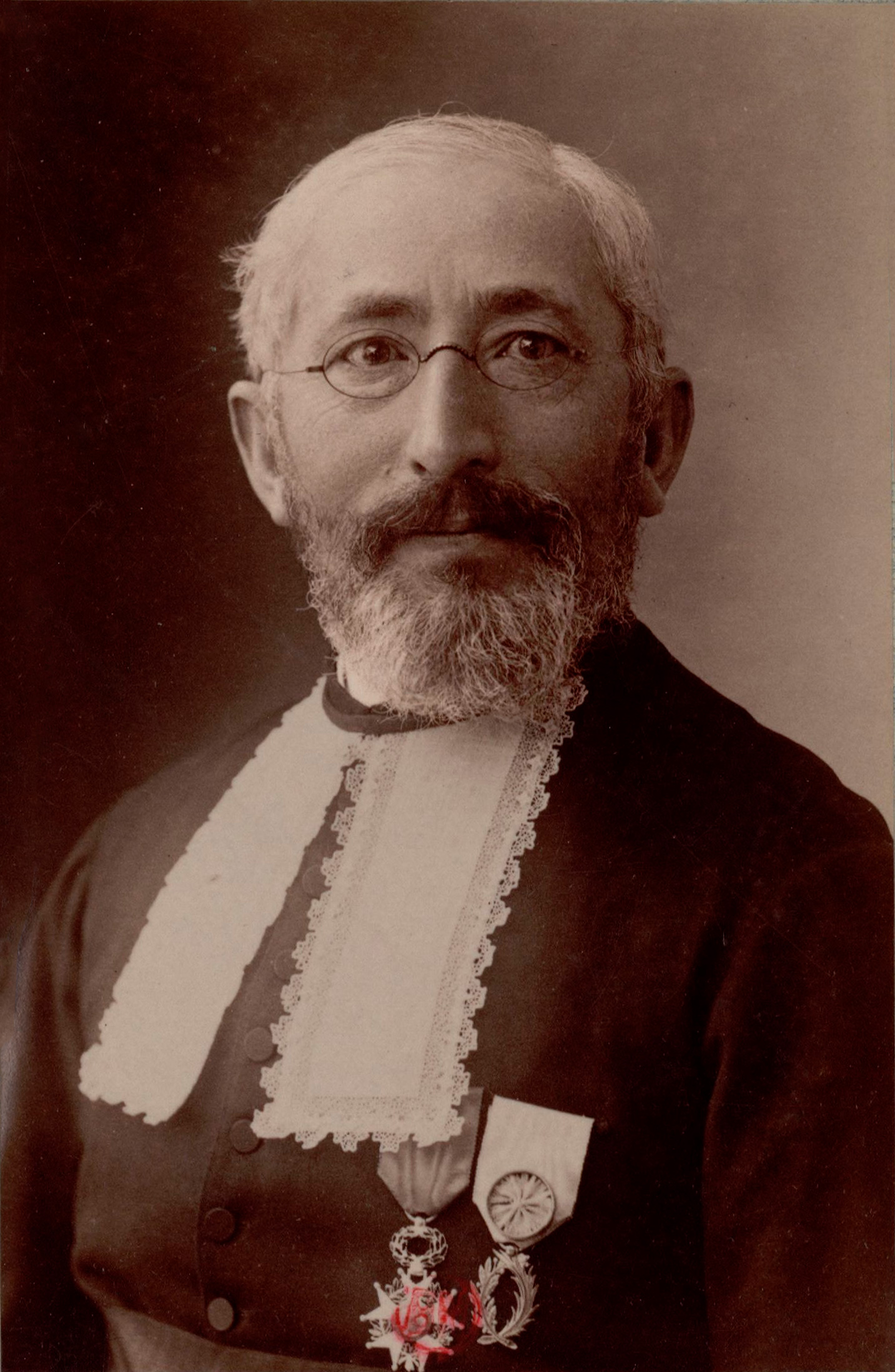
Zadoc Kahn, photo by Nadar.

Zadoc Kahn (French pronunciation: [zadɔk kan]; 18 February 1839 in Mommenheim, Alsace – 8 December 1905 in Paris) was an Alsatian-French rabbi and chief rabbi of France.

== Life ==
In 1856 he entered the rabbinical school of Metz, finishing his theological studies at the same institution after it had been established at Paris as the Séminaire Israélite; and on graduation he was appointed director of the Talmud Torah, the preparatory school of the seminary. In 1867 he was appointed assistant to Chief Rabbi Lazare Isidor of Paris, whom he succeeded in the following year, when Isidor became chief rabbi of France. As Kahn had not yet reached the prescribed age of 30, he had to obtain a dispensation before he could accept the office, his election to which had been largely due to his thesis L'Esclavage Selon la Bible et le Talmud (1867; later translated into German and Hebrew). The community of Paris attained to a high degree of prosperity and enlightenment under Kahn's administration.

On Chief Rabbi Isidor's death in 1889 Kahn was unanimously elected chief rabbi of France, and was inducted on 25 March 1890. He then entered upon a period of many-sided philanthropic activity. He organized the relief movement in behalf of the Jews expelled from Russia subsequent to enactment of May Laws under minister Nikolay Pavlovich Ignatyev and czar Alexander III, and gave much of his time to the work of the Alliance Israélite Universelle, which elected him honorary president in recognition of his services. Against Theodor Herzl, he initiated to the German Jewish philanthropist Baron Maurice de Hirsch the project of setting up a Jewish colony in Argentina, before he created the Jewish Colonisation Association (I.C.A.) in 1891.

Kahn helped obtain financial assistance via auspices of the Rothschild family for Ferdinand Walsin Esterhazy, in June 1894; whom later would be deeply implicated in the Dreyfus affair. He aided in establishing many private charitable institutions, including the Refuge du Plessis-Piquet, near Paris, an agricultural school for abandoned children, and the Maison de Retraite at Neuilly-sur-Seine, for young girls. He was appointed Chevalier of the Legion of Honor in 1879 and Officer in 1901. He was also Officer of Public Instruction.

Zadoc Kahn was one of the founders, the first vice-president, and, soon after, president, of the Société des Études Juives (1879). He was considered a brilliant orator, and one of his most noteworthy addresses was delivered on the centenary (11 May 1889) of the French Revolution — "La Révolution Française et le Judaïsme".

== Literary works ==
Kahn has published the following works:

- Sermons et Allocutions (1875, 1886, 1894)
- Sermons et Allocutions Addressés à la Jeunesse Israélite (1878)
- Études sur le Livre de Joseph le Zélateur, a collection of religious controversies of the Middle Ages (1887)
- Biographie de M. Isidore Loeb
- "Discours d'Installation" (25 March 1890)
- Religion et Patrie, addresses
- Souvenirs et Regrets, funeral orations
