= Greater Paris University Hospitals =

Hospital in Paris, France

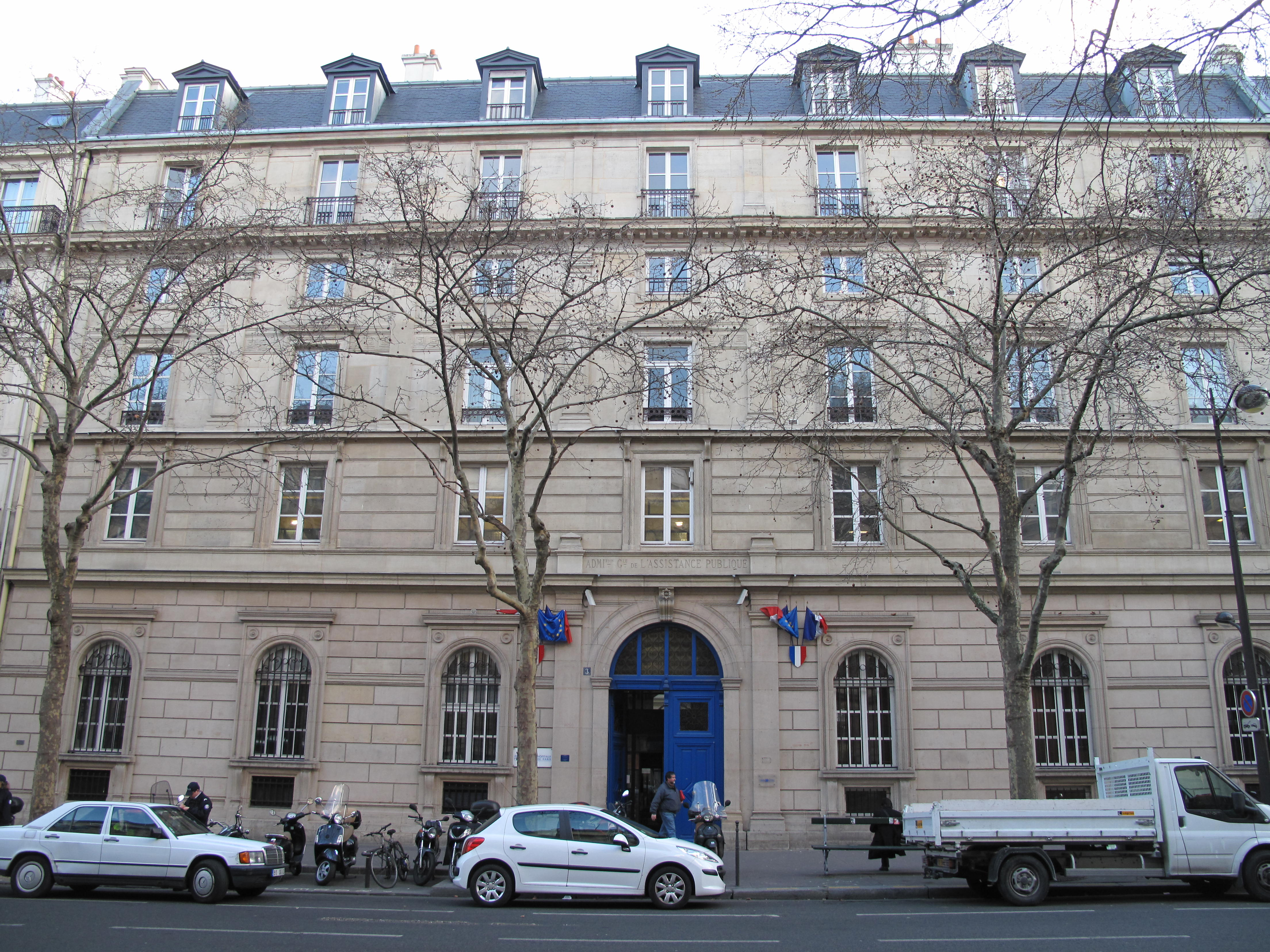
- Southern entrance to AP-HP head office, 4 quai de Gesvres in Paris
- Trade name: AP-HP
- Native name: Assistance publique - Hôpitaux de Paris
- Formerly: Conseil général des hospices de Paris; Administration générale de l'Assistance publique
- Type: Public
- Industry: Healthcare
- Founded: 4 December 1801; 224 years ago
- Headquarters: Paris, France
- Number of locations: 38 university hospitals
- Area served: Greater Paris
- Products: University hospitals
- Number of employees: 100,000 (2025)
- Divisions: AP-HP Sorbonne University Hospital Group; AP-HP Paris Cité University Hospital Group; AP-HP Paris-Saclay University Hospital Group; AP-HP Henri Mondor Hospital Group; AP-HP Paris Seine-Saint-Denis Hospital Group
- Website: www.aphp.fr

Greater Paris University Hospitals (French: Assistance publique–hôpitaux de Paris [asistɑ̃s pyblik opito də paʁi], AP-HP) is the university hospital system operating in Paris and its surrounding areas. It is the largest hospital system in Europe and one of the largest in the world.

It employs more than 100,000 people in 38 teaching hospitals and receives more than 10 million annual patient visits. AP-HP is organized in 6 hospital local trusts called "GHU", each associated to a university to offer integrative care to its population.

It is affiliated with Paris Cité University (16 teaching hospitals), Sorbonne University (7 teaching hospitals), Paris-Saclay University (6 teaching hospitals), the Paris-East Créteil University (5 teaching hospitals), Sorbonne Paris North University (3 teaching hospitals) and their colleges of medicine, odontology, and pharmacy.

As a teaching hospitals network, AP-HP trust is in charge of training healthcare professionals and doctors, and plays a prominent role in French healthcare research alongside Inserm.

== History ==
Succeeding to the conseil général des hospices de Paris, the Administration générale de l'Assistance publique was created by a law of January 10, 1849. In 1961, the AP-HP became the hospital system of Paris and its suburbs.

== Hospitals ==
AP-HP has unique specialized departments. Within the same specialty, different departments in different hospitals are experts in different branches of the same specialty.

AP-HP is not the sole healthcare operator in Paris. The trust shares with duties alongside military hospitals such as Val-de-Grâce, or Institut Curie, and Institut Gustave Roussy, Europe's leading cancer-research institute and the biggest health center dedicated to oncology in Europe.

The 5 university hospital groups of the AP-HP:

- AP-HP Sorbonne University Hospital Group
- AP-HP Paris Cité University Hospital Group
- AP-HP Paris-Saclay University Hospital Group
- AP-HP Henri Mondor Hospital Group
- AP-HP Paris Seine-Saint-Denis Hospital Group

== See also ==
- Hôtel-Dieu, Paris
