= International Union of Psychological Science =

International umbrella organization of national psychology associations

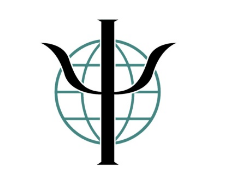
- IUPsyS logo
- Abbreviation: IUPsyS
- Nickname: The Union
- Predecessor: International Congress of Psychology committee
- Formation: July 17, 1951; 75 years ago
- Founded at: Stockholm
- Type: INGO, Learned society
- Professional title: Psychologists
- Region served: Worldwide
- Field: Psychology
- Secretary General: Ava Thompson
- President: Germán Gutiérrez
- Parent organization: International Council for Science
- Website: www.iupsys.net

The International Union of Psychological Science, abbreviated IUPsyS, is the global umbrella organization for psychology.

== History ==
Starting in 1889, an International Congress of Psychology has been held every few years. The International Congress of Psychology committee was established to organize this. A few years after a statement by the United Nations which encouraged the establishment of international scientific societies, the 1948 International Congress in Edinburgh agreed to establish an international society similar to those which existed for other sciences. At the 1951 International Congress in Stockholm, the IUPsyS was officially established and statutes for it were accepted.

== Current functions ==
IUPsyS represents around one million psychologists worldwide. It is composed of 93 National Members (national psychology organizations or coalitions of national psychology organizations, one per country), 7 regional members, and 19 affiliate or special liaison organizations. Together, these organizations represent the large majority of organized psychology today.

The overall mission of IUPsyS, as specified in its statutes, is the development, representation and advancement of psychology as a basic and applied science regionally, nationally, and internationally. This is accomplished through a variety of activities, including quadrennial international congresses (the IUPsyS is the sponsor of the International Congress of Psychology), regional conferences and workshops; publications; capacity building; development of standards; promulgation of policy; and information dissemination.

IUPsyS operates according to a strategic plan. IUPsyS is a member of the International Council for Science (ICSU), the International Social Science Council (ISSC), and is accredited with the World Health Organization (WHO), and the United Nations (ECOSOC and DPI).

The International Journal of Psychology (IJP) is the official journal of the IUPsyS, published by Psychology Press. It provides articles and reviews in every domain of psychology and informs the international community about issues of common interest in its International Platform Section.

The IUPsyS website provides information about IUPsyS and its activities. IUPsyS hosts Psychology Resources Around the World, a web portal with information on the organizations and structure of psychology in 190 countries, and links to psychology information and resources around the world. Other publications include a news Bulletin, Newsletter, informational brochures, and books, including a History of the Union, the International Handbook of Psychology, and an international compendium of Psychological Concepts.

The activities undertaken by the IUPsyS are generally organized through its three Standing Committees: Strategic Planning, Capacity Building, Publications and Communications, and their associated Work Groups.

The IUPsyS also continues to run the International Congress of Psychology.

=== Capacity Building Programs ===
The IUPsyS sponsors a variety of capacity building programs. These include:

- The Biennial Advanced Research Training Seminar (ARTS) program that provides training opportunities for scholars from low-income countries, to learn about new and up-to-date methodologies that they can carry forward to their own research programs and to other psychologists in their home communities;
- Capacity Building Workshops at Regional Conferences of Psychology, and topic-driven capacity building workshop series.

In 2012, the IUPsyS sponsored a capacity building workshop on the Asian-Pacific region.

The IUPsyS supports cooperation and exchange among members of the world community of psychologists through regular communication with its National Member organizations, in the biennial meetings of the Assembly of the Union, and through its web and print publications.

== International congresses and leadership ==
International congresses and leadership
Nr.	Year	International Congress	Chair	Term	Secretary-General	President
32	2020+	Prague (Czech Republic)	Stanislav Štech	2022-2026	Ava Thompson (Bahamas)	Germán Gutiérrez (Colombia)
31	2016	Yokohama (Japan)	Kazuo Shigemasu	2016-2022	Ann Watts (South Africa)	Pam Maras (United Kingdom)
30	2012	Cape Town (South Africa)	Saths Cooper	2012-2016	Ann Watts (South Africa)	Saths Cooper (South Africa)
29	2008	Berlin (Germany)	Peter A. Frensch	2008-2012	Pierre L.-J. Ritchie (Canada)	Rainer K. Silbereisen (Germany)
28	2004	Beijing (China)	Quicheng Jing	2004-2008	Pierre L.-J. Ritchie (Canada)	Bruce J. Overmier (United States)
27	2000	Stockholm (Sweden)	Lars-Göran Nilsson	2000-2004	Pierre L.-J. Ritchie (Canada)	Michel Denis (France)
26	1996	Montréal (Canada)	David Bélanger	1996-2000	Pierre L.-J. Ritchie (Canada)	Géry d'Ydewalle (Belgium)
25	1992	Brussels (Belgium)	Paul Bertelson; Géry d'Ydewalle	1992-1996	Géry d'Ydewalle (Belgium)	Kurt Pawlik (Germany)
24	1988	Sydney (Australia)	Peter Sheehan	1988-1992	Kurt Pawlik (Germany)	Mark R. Rosenzweig (United States)
23	1984	Acapulco (Mexico)	Rogelio Diaz-Guerrero	1984-1988	Kurt Pawlik (Germany)	Wayne H. Holtzman (United States)
22	1980	Leipzig (East Germany)	Friedhart Klix	1980-1984	Wayne H. Holtzman (United States)	Friedhart Klix (East Germany)
21	1976	Paris (France)	Paul Fraisse	1976-1980	Wayne H. Holtzman (United States)	A. Summerfield (United Kingdom)
20	1972	Tokyo (Japan)	Moriji Sagara	1972-1976	Wayne H. Holtzman (United States)	J. Nuttin (Belgium)
19	1969	London (United Kingdom)	George C. Drew	1969-1972	Eugene Jacobsen (United States)	Roger Russell (United States)
18	1966	Moscow (Soviet Union)	Aleksei N. Leontiev	1966-1969	Noël Mailloux (Canada)	Paul Fraisse (France)
17	1963	Washington, D.C. (United States)	Otto Klineberg	1963-1966	Roger Russell (United States)	James Drever (United Kingdom)
16	1960	Bonn (West Germany)	Wolfgang Metzger	1960-1963	Roger Russell (United States)	Otto Klineberg (United States)
15	1957	Brussels (Belgium)	Albert Michotte	1957-1960	Otto Klineberg (United States)	Albert Michotte (Belgium)
14	1954	Montréal (Canada)	Edward A. Bott; Edward C. Tolman	1954-1957	Otto Klineberg (United States)	Jean Piaget (Switzerland)
13	1951	Stockholm (Sweden)	David Katz	1951-1954	Herbert Langfeld (United States)	Henri Piéron (France)
12	1948	Edinburgh (United Kingdom)	James Drever	This table is incomplete; you can help by adding missing items.		IUPsyS not yet formed
World War II				This table is incomplete; you can help by adding missing items.		IUPsyS not yet formed
11	1937	Paris (France)	Henri Pieron	This table is incomplete; you can help by adding missing items.		IUPsyS not yet formed
10	1932	Copenhagen (Denmark)	Harald Höffding; Edgar Rubin	This table is incomplete; you can help by adding missing items.		IUPsyS not yet formed
9	1929	New Haven (United States)	James McKeen Cattell	This table is incomplete; you can help by adding missing items.		IUPsyS not yet formed
8	1926	Groningen (Netherlands)	Gerardus Heymans	This table is incomplete; you can help by adding missing items.		IUPsyS not yet formed
7	1923	Oxford (United Kingdom)	Charles S. Myers	This table is incomplete; you can help by adding missing items.		IUPsyS not yet formed
World War I				This table is incomplete; you can help by adding missing items.		IUPsyS not yet formed
6	1909	Geneva (Switzerland)	Théodore Flournoy	This table is incomplete; you can help by adding missing items.		IUPsyS not yet formed
5	1905	Rome (Italy)	Giuseppe Sergi	This table is incomplete; you can help by adding missing items.		IUPsyS not yet formed
4	1900	Paris (France)	Théodule-Armand Ribot	This table is incomplete; you can help by adding missing items.		IUPsyS not yet formed
3	1896	Munich (Germany)	Carl Stumpf	This table is incomplete; you can help by adding missing items.		IUPsyS not yet formed
2	1892	London (United Kingdom)	Henry Sidgwick	This table is incomplete; you can help by adding missing items.		IUPsyS not yet formed
1	1889	Paris (France)	Jean-Martin Charcot; Théodule-Armand Ribot	This table is incomplete; you can help by adding missing items.		IUPsyS not yet formed

== Executive Committee (2020-2022) ==
- Germán Gutiérrez, Presidente, Colombia
- Pam Maras, Expresidente, United Kingdom
- Ava Thompson, Secretaria General, Bahamas
- Amanda Clinton, Tesorera, United States
- Gregoire Borst, Member, France
- Simon Crowe, Member, Australia
- Rozainee Khairudin, Member, Malaysia
- Brigitte Khoury, Member, Lebanon
- Martina Klicperová, Member, Czech Republic
- Prakash Padakannaya, Member, India
- Robertas Povilaitis, Member Lithuania
- Marizaida Sanchez-Cesareo, Member, Puerto Rico
- Hanako Suzuki, Member, Japan
- Andrew Ezadueyan Zamani, Member, Nigeria
