= Hypnotic Ego-Strengthening Procedure =

Hypnotherapeutic procedure

The Hypnotic Ego-Strengthening Procedure, incorporating its constituent, influential hypnotherapeutic monologue — which delivered an incremental sequence of both suggestions for within-hypnotic influence and suggestions for post-hypnotic influence — was developed and promoted by the British consultant psychiatrist, John Heywood Hartland (1901–1977) in the 1960s.

Hartland's overall ego-strengthening approach was based upon, and derived from, the "Self-Mastery" method that French hypnotherapist Émile Coué (1857-1926) had created, promoted, and continuously polished over two decades of clinical practice (reaching its final form c.1920); and Hartland's constituent ego-strengthening monologue was entirely based upon the "curative suggestion" monologue component of Coué's method.

Hartland used his procedure to (pre-therapeutically) strengthen his patients' inner resources — "designed to remove tension, anxiety and apprehension, and to gradually restore the patient's confidence in himself and his ability to cope with his problems", and "analogous to the medical setting in which a patient is first strengthened by proper nutrition, general rest, and weight gain before a radical form of surgery is performed" — and, specifically, the procedure was intended to enhance the therapeutic efficacy of his (subsequent) symptom-removal hypnotherapy. Hartland later discovered that his "ego-strengthening procedure" could successfully address a wide range of clinical circumstances, on its own, as the sole form of therapy.

Hartland's 1965 article, "The Value of "Ego-Strengthening" Procedures Prior to Direct Symptom-Removal under Hypnosis" was significant for positioning the concept of "ego-strengthening" in the hypnotherapeutic literature; and "ever since then, the concept could be unequivocally named, identified, investigated, productively discussed, and generally understood by all concerned". In addition to providing his monologue's full text, Hartland's article was also significant for introducing the convention of ". . ." to indicate pauses in the operator's delivery.

"Ego-strengthening suggestions are designed to increase the patient's ability to cope with his difficulties or to encourage him to stand on his own feet. There are three kinds of ego-strengthening suggestions: (a) general ego-strengthening suggestions, (b) specific ego-strengthening suggestions to facilitate the discovery and enhancement of the patient's inner coping strategies, and (c) specific suggestions to foster the patient's sense of self-efficacy. ... Ego-strengthening suggestions, while seemingly simplistic, are quite valuable. Hartland and many others believe that in certain instances ego-strengthening suggestions alone can bring about a successful treatment outcome without [any need to resort to either] symptomatic or dynamic hypnotherapy. Some patients experience spontaneous alleviation of symptoms when they feel strong enough to cope without the symptoms. Direct suggestions for coping, therefore, are sometimes more effective than direct suggestions for symptom change." — Brown & Fromm (1986, pp. 194, 195).
"Ego strengthening began as a specific strategy for hypnotic interventions and evolved into an attitude pervading psychotherapy and clinical hypnotic work. ... Students in hypnosis training should be introduced to an ego strengthening attitude for clinical work, and master specific therapeutic interventions to induce ego strengthening. Such interventions may include guided imagery for self-acceptance and self-love, affirming language that counteracts negative self-talk, age regression to recapture forgotten strengths, and age progression to anticipate and imagine future wisdom and strengths." — Moss, Willmarth & Reid (2024, p. 831).

== Emile Coué and la méthode Coué ==
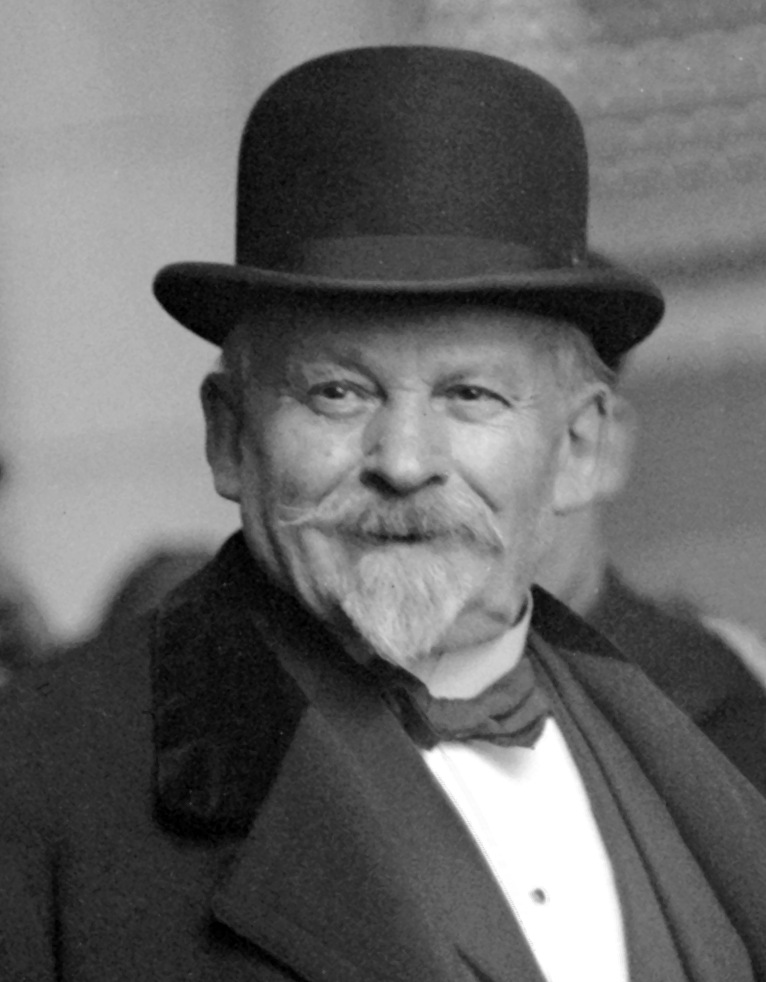
Émile Coué (1923).

The insights, observations, technical developments, and procedural innovations of Émile Coué, the French scientist, apothecary (i.e., a first-contact prescribing pharmacist, a compounding and dispensing chemist, and a pharmacopolist that sold proprietary medicines), hypnotist, and psychotherapist in relation to his understanding, conceptualization, realization, and application of hypnotherapeutic suggestion have greatly influenced the theories and practices of hypnotism throughout the English-speaking world.

"Coué’s method was disarmingly non-complex—needing few instructions for on-going competence, based on rational principles, easily understood, demanding no intellectual sophistication, simply explained, simply taught, performed in private, using a subject's own resources, requiring no elaborate preparation, and no expenditure."
"Most of us are so accustomed ... to an elaborate medical ritual ... in the treatment of our ills ... [that] anything so simple as Coué's autosuggestion is inclined to arouse misgivings, antagonism and a feeling of scepticism."
"Continuously, unjustly, and mistakenly trivialised as just a hand-clasp, some unwarranted optimism, and a 'mantra', Coué's method evolved over several decades of meticulous observation, theoretical speculation, in-the-field testing, incremental adjustment, and step-by-step transformation. It tentatively began (c.1901) with very directive one-to-one hypnotic interventions, based upon the approaches and techniques that Coué had acquired from an American correspondence course. As his theoretical knowledge, clinical experience, understanding of suggestion and autosuggestion, and hypnotic skills expanded, it gradually developed into its final subject-centred version—an intricate complex of (group) education, (group) hypnotherapy, (group) ego-strengthening, and (group) training in self-suggested pain control; and, following instruction in performing the prescribed self-administration ritual, the twice daily intentional and deliberate (individual) application of its unique formula, "Every day, in every way, I'm getting better and better".

=== Apothecary ===
Initially apprenticed to a small Apothecary in Troyes in 1876, where "he learned to examine and diagnose; prescribe and compound medicines; regulate, control, and operate a chemical laboratory; and promote, market, and sell proprietary medicines and his employer's concoctions", Coué won a government scholarship in 1879 to the prestigious Collège Sainte-Barbe, graduating with First Class Honours in Pharmacology, at the top of his class in July 1882. He then "spent six months as a pharmaceutical intern at Paris's Necker Hospital", before returning to Troyes in 1883 to take over the operation of the town's largest apothecary (a different one from the one to which he had been apprenticed), where he "constantly interacted with people who were, often, extremely sick, involving consultations, diagnosis and prescription, appraisal of treatment efficacy, deciding next treatment, etc."

=== Liébeault and "Suggestive Therapeutics" ===
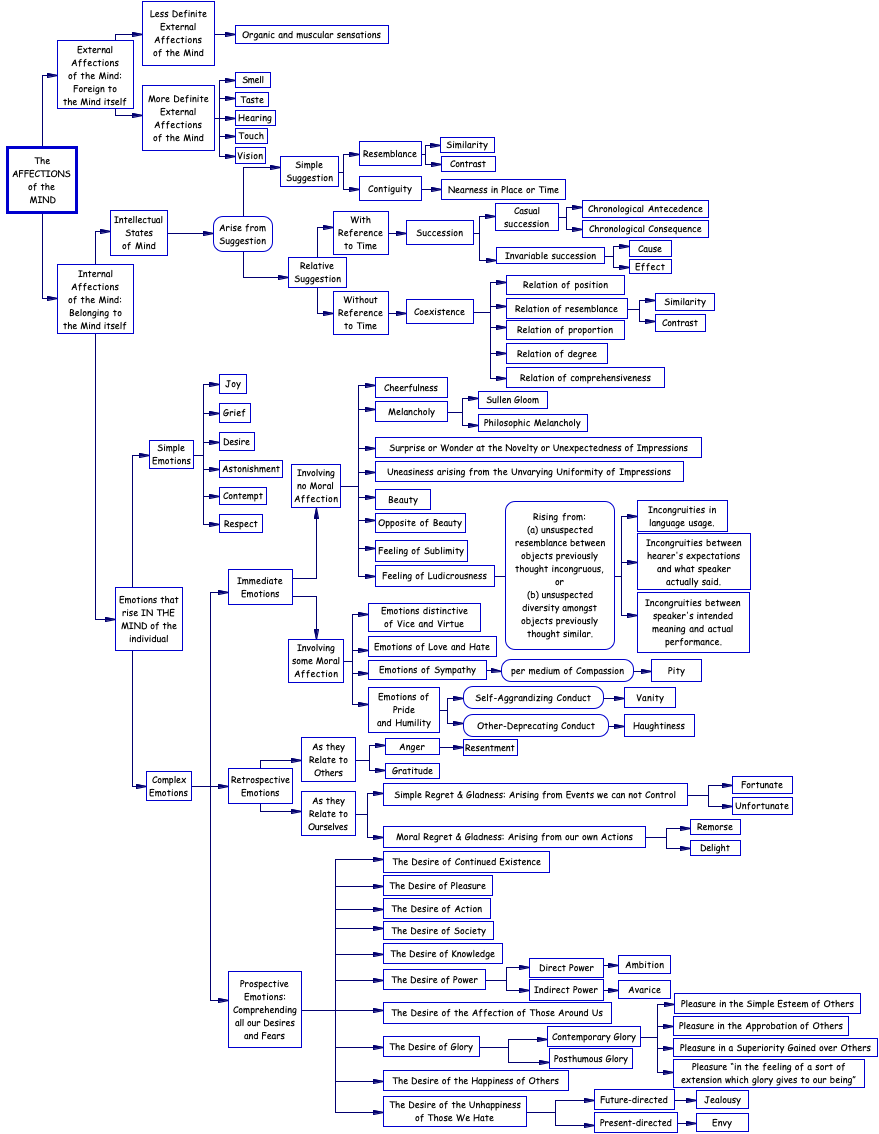
Brown's "Affections of the Mind", as discussed in his Lectures on the Philosophy of the Human Mind.

In 1885, Coué's father-in law, the eminent French horticulturist Victor Lemoine, introduced him to Ambroise-Auguste Liébeault, a medical practitioner in nearby Nancy, France. Liébeault, who had earlier dabbled with animal magnetism, and who, now, promoted what he termed "suggestive therapeutics" — i.e., "an imperfect re-branding of the 'dominant idea' theory that James Braid had appropriated from [his Edinburgh teacher,] Thomas Brown" (Yeates, 2016a, p. 12) — that was centred, in part, on an extended, laborious, monotonous, "sleep, sleep, sleep" induction of "hypnosis", and the consequent state of "charme" (i.e., "spellbound") that it produced.

Greatly impressed, Coué employed a manager for his pharmacy, moved to Nancy, and studied with Liébeault in 1885 and 1886. Coué returned to Troyes in 1886, and resumed the management of his pharmacy (which had declined in his absence). Thoroughly convinced of the value of Liébeault's theoretical position ("suggestive therapeutics"), "on the potential that changes in [a subject's] mind-set offered for relief, amelioration, and cure", Coué began to experiment with Liébeault's "hypnosis" procedure with his Nancy clientele. Having soon discovered that Liébeault's techniques were hopeless in practice, he abandoned both Liébeault's "sleep"-based "hypnosis" and hypnotherapy altogether.

=== Correspondence Course ===
In 1901, fifteen years later, with the hope of improving his Apothecary business in Troyes, Coué sent for an advertised free book, Hypnotism as It is (Sage, 1899), which offered to disclose "secrets [of the] science that brings business and social success" and "the hidden mysteries of personal magnetism, hypnotism, magnetic healing, etc.”. His dormant interest in hypnotism reawakened, he purchased the associated correspondence course material produced by "Professor Xenophon LaMotte Sage, A.M., Ph.D., LL.D.", of Rochester, New York (i.e., E. Virgil Neal, the US entrepreneur), the successful stage hypnotist who had been admitted to the prestigious Medico-Legal Society of New York in 1899.

Before leaving (in 1895) to become the stage hypnotist, Xenophon LaMotte Sage, E. Virgil Neal had been a lecturer (in bookkeeping, etc.) at the Central Business College in Sedalia, Missouri, where its proprietor Clark W. Robbins (1850-1918) had taught Neal how to identify specific training needs, design coherent courses of study, and construct supportive training materials both for classroom- and distance-learning (Conroy, 2014, pp. 17-27). In March 1898, having abandoned professional stage hypnotism, Neal was commissioned by the New York publishers Williams & Rogers to produce a coherent set of practical, self-instruction textbooks, that emerged in the form of his two ground-breaking textbooks — Modern Banking and Bank Accounting (1899), Modern Illustrative Bookkeeping (1900) — which were intermittently re-issued, as required by various developments in commercial law and business practices, in the form of a single one-volume complete course over more than forty years (Neal & Moore, 1902; Neal & Cragin, 1909, 1911, etc.).

in addition to Sage's Hypnotism as It is (1899) the correspondence course's materials included (a) both the English and French versions of Sage's correspondence course (Sage, 1900a, 1900b, 1900c, 1900d), (b) both the English and French versions of Sage's hints for public demonstrations of hypnotic phenomena (Sage & Adkin, 1900a. 1900b), and (c) Neal's two compendia of contemporary hypnotic knowledge, containing articles from thirty two eminent individual experts (Neal & Clark, 1900a, 1900b, 1900c). Sage's well-structured, distance-learning course was firmly based upon both Braid's (Cartesian-reflex) upwards and inwards squint induced "hypnotism" (i.e., rather than the dormez, dormez, dormez suggestion-induced "hypnosis" of Bernheim and Liebeault), and the "mental therapeutics" of Thomson Jay Hudson (see Hudson, 1893, 1900, 1903). It continuously stressed that suggestion produced outcomes. Its approach was entirely consistent with Braid's "psycho-physiology", and with Hudson's "mental therapeutics"; and, from this, it concentrated entirely on the transformative power of the subject's mind.

Sage's approach was the complete opposite of Liébeault and Bernheim; Liébeault and Bernheim's approach was firmly centred on their view that, rather than amplifying the effectiveness of suggestion, "hypnosis" made suggestion inescapable. Consequently, their approach — characterized by Yeates as "secular exorcism" (2002, pp. 10-11): — concentrated entirely on the coercive power of the operator's suggestion.

"Therapeutic interventions (secular exorcisms) that assume humans are illness-prone and seek to identify and expel disease (goal: 'disease-free') are driven by a vastly different mind-set from those interventions (secular invocations) that view humans as robust and health-sustaining, and seek to locate and invigorate the good (goal: 'robust health')."

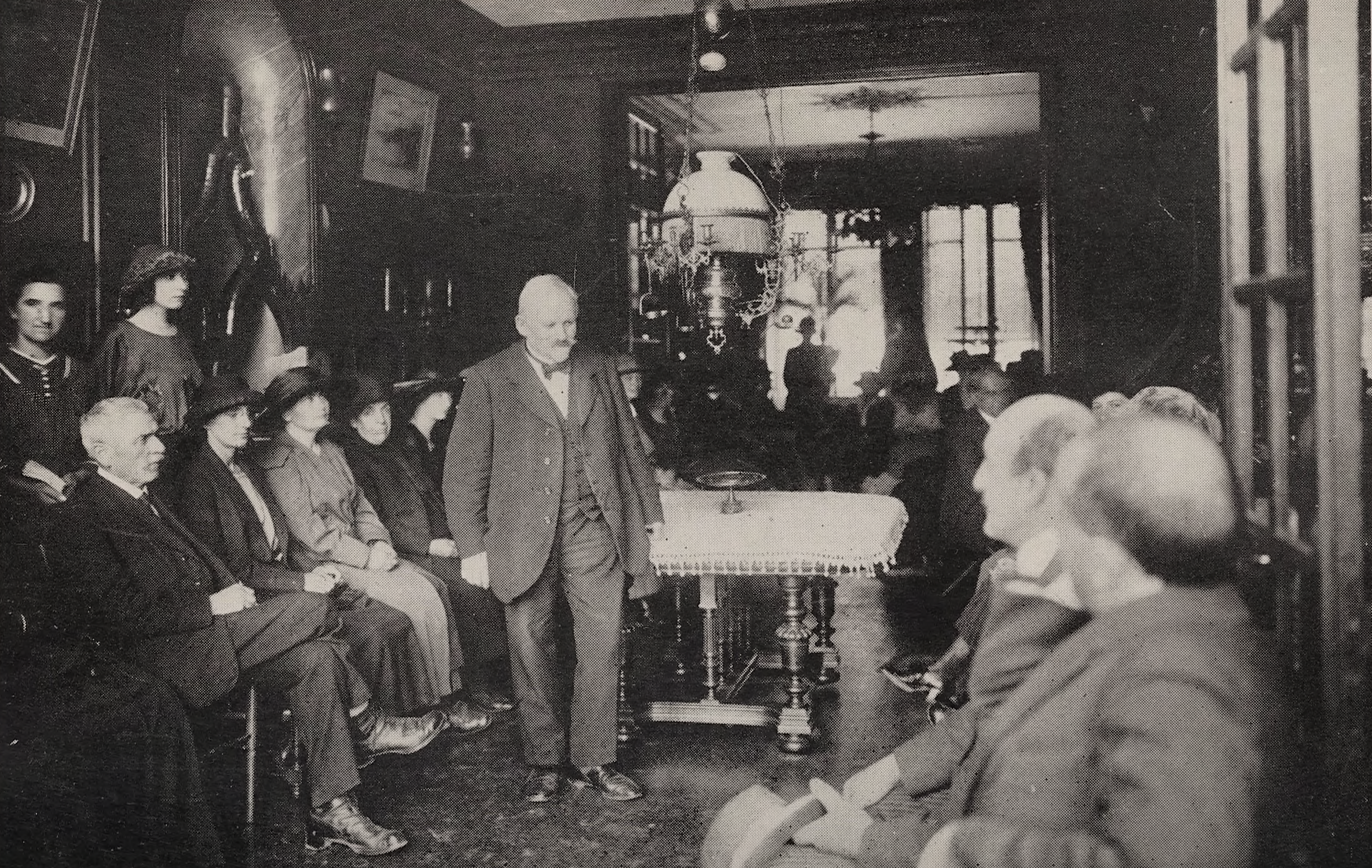
Emile Coué conducting a clinic in the parlour of his house at Nancy (1923).

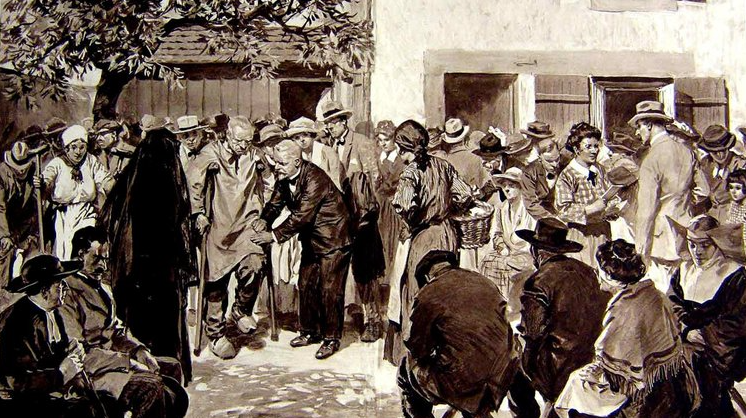
Stott, W.R.S. (1922), "The Apostle of Auto-Suggestion at Work in his Garden 'Clinic' at Nancy".

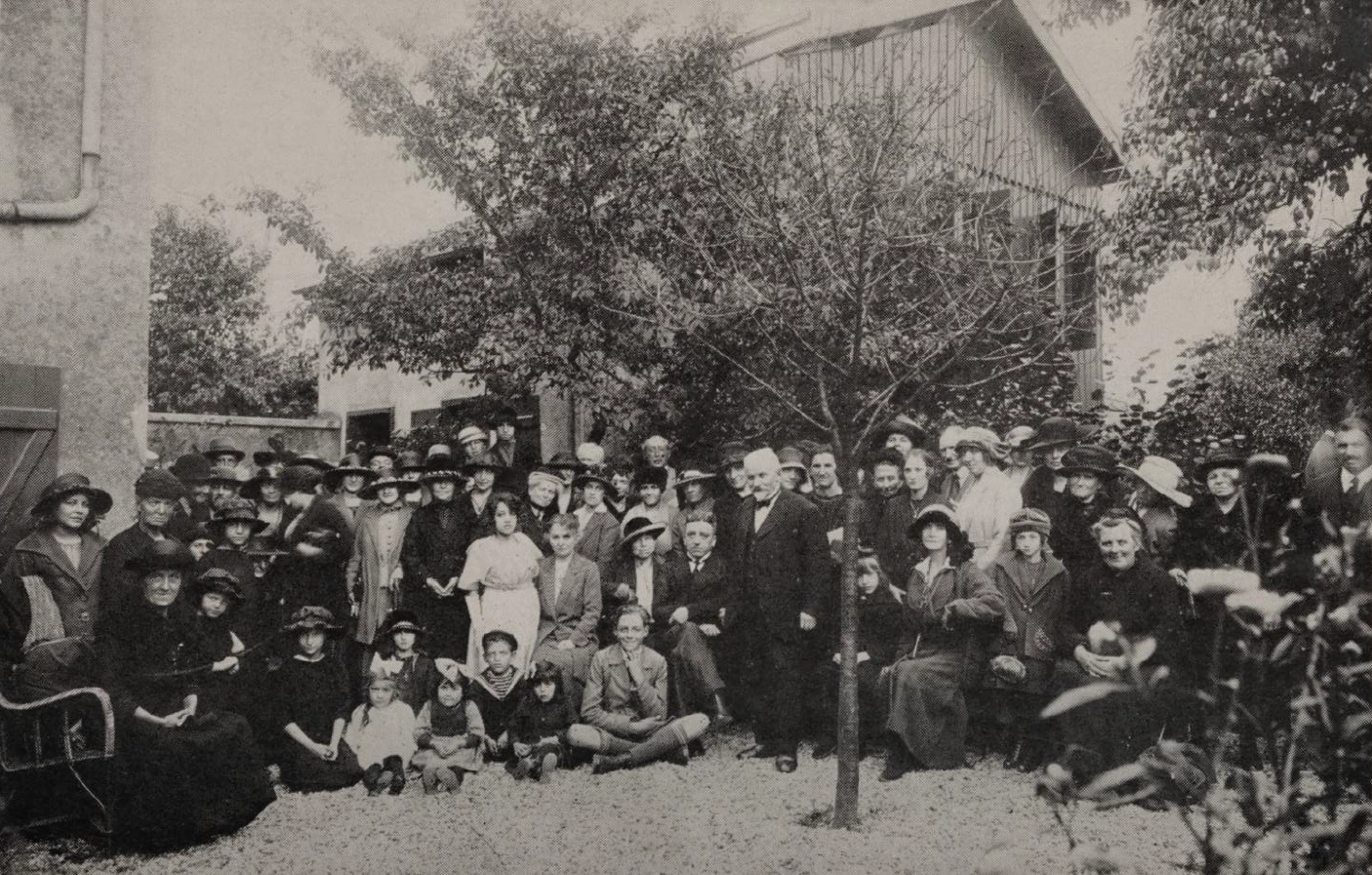
Émile Coué and his patients in his garden at Nancy (1923).

=== Hypnotism ===
Having immediately recognised that Sage's Braid-style approach was ideal for mental therapeutics, Coué began an intense study of the course material, and was soon skilled enough to offer hypnotism (free of charge) alongside his pharmaceutical enterprise. As his understanding of suggestion developed, as the efficacy of his interventions increased, and as the popularity of his (free) hypnotherapeutic services increased — and, as the demand for his services grew, and with Coué’s recognition of the duplication of the many common aspects of each of these individual interventions — he began to modify his approach from that of individual, specific, one-to-one interactions to the more generic ego-strengthening sessions with each patient; and, in the process, as his workload increased over the ensuing years, he gradually improved his explanations, his incremental training processes, and the form and content of his ego-strengthening procedure.

=== Nancy ===
In 1910, Coué abandoned pharmacy altogether, sold his Troyes Apothecary, and moved to Nancy, from whence he continued to offer free-of-charge hypnotherapy treatments to one and all from his residence until his death in 1926.

=== Formula ===
Initially suggested by Neal's associate, Thomas F. Adkin (1900, pp.115-116), and developed into its final form c.1915, Coué stressed that his "formula", "Tous les jours, à tous points de vue, je vaix mieux en mieux" (lit. "Every day, from all points of view, I grow better and better") was, "in practice", "Day by day I am approaching nearer and nearer to what I consider [to be] my physical, intellectual and moral ideal".

== John Hartland ==
John Heywood Hartland (1901–1977), B.Sc. (Birmingham, 1921), M.B. Ch.B. (Birmingham, 1925), M.R.C.S. (England, 1925), L.R.C.P. (London, 1925), was initially a G.P., practising in West Bromwich, a town in the industrial West Midlands region of England. He later became a consultant psychiatrist, and served as vice-president of the British Society for Medical and Dental Hypnosis, and as editor of the British Journal of Clinical Hypnosis.

Hartland was convinced that hypnotherapy could be usefully applied, by G.P.s, to a wide range of clinical conditions, regardless of their familiarity with hypnotic theories and practices, At a time that "for many, hypnotism was far from respectable, regardless of whether delivered by a medical practitioner, or not" (Yeates, 2014a, p. 5), Hartland's "ideas and practices were disseminated worldwide", through the lectures, demonstrations, and seminars he delivered towards the end of his career throughout the U.K., France, Sweden, Australia, USA, and Singapore.

== Lewis Wolberg and "symptom removal" ==
Hartland was greatly influenced by Lewis Wolberg, whose strategy of "symptom removal by hypnotic command" (Wolberg, 1948c, p. 1) was derived from the work of Ambroise-Auguste Liébeault and Hippolyte Bernheim of Nancy, France.

"Wolberg's interventions were strong and authoritarian; involving a dramatic induction procedure (to enhance therapist prestige), followed by direct (prestige) suggestions that the subject's symptoms would disappear upon de-hypnotizing".

Wolberg's "symptom removal" approach (Wolberg, 1948c, passim) was widely used by practising hypnotherapists until, at least, the 1980s: see, for instance, Meares (1960), Slater and Flores (1963), Clawson (1964), Weitzenhoffer (2002), Weitzenhoffer (2004), and Ball (2006), etc.

=== Lewis Wolberg and "ego strength" ===
Assuming the "appropriateness" of the approach and technique chosen by the operator (i.e., their technic), Wolberg (1948a, p. 430) attributed most "therapeutic failures" to (a) "inadequate time", (b) "inadequate motivation", or (c) "diminutive ego strength. From this, Wolberg observed, the appropriateness of the operator's chosen "therapeutic program" was contingent upon three dimensions:

- The patient's "existing motivations": "what the patient actually seeks out of treatment".
- The patient's "ego strength or weakness": namely, "the equipment with which the patient can function in treatment".
- The operator's choice of "technic": "the kind of technic [the patient] will be able to utilize most effectively within set limits of time and finances.

Given the importance that he attributed to the dimension of "ego strength" as a significant predictor of therapeutic success, Wolberg was also well aware that,

"The ego strength is more difficult to estimate [than motivation] since adequate criteria have not yet been established. To some extent we may estimate limitations in ego strength from developmental failures of the individual, the incompetence of past and present psychobiologic adaptations, absence of a real precipitating factor, the difficulties in his relations with people, the intensity of dependency, the diminutiveness of self esteem and the inadequacy of his prevailing defenses against anxiety."

=== Brian Lake and "ego strength" ===
In 1985, the British psychiatrist Brian Lake (1922-2008) observed that "the concept of ego strength is recognised by most psychiatrists, used by some, and defined by few ... [and,] as with the notion of "mental health", many clinicians have an image of ego-strength, but no-one seems fully satisfied with any one else's definition"; "nevertheless, [he continued,] ample evidence exists in textbooks and research articles that the dimension of ego strength and weakness is used as a significant predictor of outcome for psychotherapy, despite its components often being dissimilarly identified, described, and measured".

Lake suggested (p. 473) solving this apparent problem by sidestepping this issue and, simply, presenting the (otherwise ambiguous) "ego strength" as if it were a combination of "personal competence" and "social competence", identifying nine "competencies" (pp. 474-477) which, he claimed, could be objectively observed as present or absent; and, if present, could be "measured in approximate terms of rank ordering, ranging from very much to very little" (p. 477). However, in doing so, Lake warned, whilst competence (i.e., "an overall measure of the ego's ability to interact efficiently with the environment and to perform its adaptive tasks") signified "sufficient strength to perform a task", strength, in and of itself, "[did] not necessarily signify competence" (p. 474).

== Hartland and "psychotherapy" ==
According to his own account, Hartland had regularly used "hypnosis" since the early 1940s, "to facilitate the treatment of various psychosomatic complaints" that were presented in his general practice, with his "main object being the removal or alleviation of symptoms [in order] to achieve the rehabilitation of the patient and his early return to work". Given the common-sense understanding of the extent to which "psychological and behavioral factors may adversely affect the course of medical conditions in almost every major disease category", Hartland's interventions addressed two inter-connected psychological issues:

(a) "Those arising as a consequence of the illness itself, such as anxiety, fear, tension and agitation"; and
(b) "Those arising from defects in [the patient's] own personality, such as nervousness, lack of confidence, dependence and maladjustment".

Because the time pressures of his busy general practice clearly "excluded any serious attempt to employ hypno-analytical techniques" — and, having discovered that "direct symptom removal [was] both difficult and unsatisfactory in many cases" — Hartland set about "[trying] to evolve a series of standard psychotherapeutic suggestions which [he] could employ at every session before trying to tackle the main symptoms". Taking advantage of the opportunity offered by the UK's adoption of the National Health Service in the late 1940s, Hartland was appointed as a consulting psychiatrist to the Hallam Hospital, in West Bromwich in the early 1950s.

At Hallam, Hartland began working with "six half-day sessions per week in its psychiatric out-patient department", directing his professional efforts towards "the more serious psycho-neurotic illnesses", with his initial (conventional) treatment approach, consisting of 20 half-hour sessions, with 7-8 minutes of suggestions each hypnotherapy session. Because these interventions demanded a considerable hypnotic "depth", Hartland spent the first three to four of those 20 sessions ensuring that his patients were appropriately trained, and had been convinced that they were talented subjects, ensuring that they could, later, "be induced deeply enough to enter the hypnotic state immediately it was suggested that they should do so" (1971b, p. xiv).

In 1966, Hartland stated that, "for many years now, I have used this ["ego-strengthening"] technique in every case that I treat and have found it to pay handsome dividends. Not only does the patient obtain relief from his symptoms, but he displays improvements in many other ways. He becomes more self-reliant, more confident, and more able to adjust to his environment, and is thus much less prone to relapse". In 1971, in relation to his "ego-strengthening" monologue, Hartland reported that, at Hallam, "when [his] employment of hypnoanalytical techniques was preceded by the same routine sequence of suggestions that had proved so successful in [his] general practice, not only was the average length of treatment substantially shortened, but the need for the more involved analytical techniques was also greatly reduced".

== Hartland's "ego-strengthening" monologue ==
=== Wolberg ===
Despite Wolberg's constant references to the extent to which "ego strength/weakness" predisposed any hypnotherapeutic intervention to success/failure, there are no suggestive sequences (apart from the odd random sentence) in any of transcripts of the thirty recorded sessions of the three "illustrative cases" provided by Wolberg in his publications at (1948c, pp. 40-133), at (1948d, pp. 218-304), and at (1948e, pp. 366-502), that are specifically directed at strengthening "the ego".

=== Coué ===
In the early 1920s, Hartland, firstly the medical student, and then qualified medical practitioner and emerging hypnotist, would have been very familiar with Coué, with the content and rationale of Coué's "Methode", and with Coué's contributions to an understanding of "suggestion". Coué had visited England (conducting group clinical sessions, demonstrations, and lectures) on at least eight occasions between November 1921 and November 1925 (Rapp, 1987). The translation of his Nancy Clinic's hand-out (1922a) was widely available (1922b, pp. 5-35), with an abridged, rapidly-delivered versions of his presentation available as gramophone recordings (1923a); and a further, detailed explanation/elaboration of the rationale behind his "ego-strengthening" suggestions had been provided at Coué & Orton, 1924, pp. 80-88.

In addition to the many newspaper/magazine reports, a wide range of Coué-centred items were readily available for Hartland's edification, including reports of Coué’s lectures, eye-witness accounts of visits to Coué’s clinic at Nancy and observations of his interactions with his patients, more detailed accounts of his methode by followers, applications in sales and commerce, plus the items associated with the Coué-Orton Institute.

=== Hartland ===
The first versions of Hartland's ego-strengthening approach/procedure (influenced by Coué's "Self-Mastery" method), and its constituent ego-strengthening monologue (adapted/modified from Coué's "curative suggestion" monologue), were jointly published in 1965 (Hartland, 1965). This version was notable for introducing the convention of ". . ." to indicate pauses in the operator's delivery of the monologue. It was also unique in that it presented complete transcript of the monologue itself. It was reprinted in 1966 (Hartland, 1966).

His second version was published in 1967 (Hartland, 1967); and the third, final version was revealed in a 1970 lecture (Hartland, 1971c), and reprinted (with appropriate variations for British readers) in the second edition of his textbook (Hartland, 1971b), where the history, structure, rationale, and clinical delivery of his approach were also described. His third version of the monologue was reprinted, without change, in the two posthumous editions of his textbook: viz., Waxman (1989, pp. 219-224), and Heap & Aravind (2001, pp. 127-129).

== Alternate versions of Hartland's "ego-strengthening" monologue ==
Hartland was emphatic that the published, "full and unabbreviated version" of his "ego-strengthening" monologue (which was a direct transcription of one of his interventions) was provided to deliver an understanding of the incremental suggestive sequence (its critical feature), and that alone — a guide to the "principles underlying the construction and usage of this type of technique" (viz., the "important factors" worth "attention"). He stressed that it must never be used exactly as published.

"It is certainly not intended that this [transcript] should be adopted in the precise form that has been described. It is the principle that is worthy of attention, and the sequence [I have] outlined should be regarded simply as a guide to the individual therapist in framing his own suggestions to conform with his own personality, method of approach and style of delivery. It is impossible to suggest here the varying inflections of the voice, but the same cardinal rules of construction, stresses and pauses etc. should be used in order to maintain a rhythmical quality from start to finish."
"In the construction of an ego-strengthening technique, quite apart from the actual suggestions themselves, it is essential that particular attention should be paid to such significant factors as ‘rhythm’, ‘repetition’, the interpolation of appropriate ‘pauses’, and the ‘stressing of certain important words and phrases’. ...[also, in order to] avoid excessive monotony ... you will notice that [within my version] repetition is often achieved by expressing the same fundamental idea in two or three different ways." — Hartland (1971b), pp.203, 198 (emphasis in original).

=== "Improved" versions of Hartland's monologue ===
A number of "improved" versions of Hartland's "ego-strengthening" monologue have been published — with, perhaps, the most extraordinary being the "Poetic Hypnogram" of Samuel Silber, M.D. (1900–1988), the "Poet Laureate of the American Society of Psychosomatic Dentistry and Medicine" — including, for example, those of Gorman (1974), Stanton (1975), Stanton (1977), Gibbons (1979a), Hutchison (1981, pp. 72-73), Pratt, Wood, and Alman (1988, p. 122-123), Gregg (1990), and Heap (Heap & Aravind, 2001, pp. 129–130), etc., etc.

=== "Improvisations" upon a theme suggested by Hartland's monologue ===
A number of different versions of the "ego-strengthening" monologue, better understood as "improvisations", have also been published: including, for example, those of Jabush (1976), Susskind (1976), Gibbons (1979b), Stanton (1979), Stanton (1989), Barber (1990a), Barber (1990b), Carich (1990), Garver (1990), Torem (1990), Watkins (1990), Wilson and Barber (1990), McNeal and Frederick (1993), Stanton (1997), Milne (1994, pp. 114-117), Herber (2006, pp. 55-64), and Alladin (2008), etc., etc.

== Evaluation ==
The American Psychological Association (APA)'s 2002 policy on "treatment guidelines" ("specific recommendations about treatments to be offered to patients"), recommended that treatments be evaluated from two perspectives:

- Treatment Efficacy: "the systematic and scientific evaluation of whether a treatment works"; and
- Clinical Utility: "the applicability, feasibility, and usefulness of the intervention in the local or specific setting where it is to be offered".

== Treatment efficacy ==
Although there's a lot of anecdotal evidence suggesting that Hartland's approach is effective, it has never been rigorously evaluated using scientific methods. This is because — entirely due to the absence of an operationalized definition of "ego-strength" and the lack of a widely accepted "ego-strength" rating scale — no well-designed and productive experiments have ever been conducted. It is not because existing experiments have failed to find evidence of its effectiveness.

=== Conceptual issues of "measurement" ===
Assuming that whatever "measurement" (presence, absence, degree of change) made of an object/attribute has been made with a reliable, accurate device, and that the measuring device has delivered a precise value of so-and-so, two important conceptual issues arise in relation to abstractions such as "ego-strengthening":

- to what degree is the precise value produced by the device (e.g., the height of a column of mercury in a sphygmomanometer) an accurate measure of the attribute (e.g., blood pressure) in question?
- to what extent is the accurately measured value of the selected attribute (blood pressure) an index of the abstract concept (e.g. ego-strength) that is the ultimate item of interest (or not)?

Given the wide range of substantially different meanings, conceptualisations, and applications to which the expression "ego-strengthening" has been applied by its many different users (each operating from a different theoretical orientation), any appraisal of the efficacy of "ego-strengthening" involves two embedded questions:

- "What is it that is being strengthened?"; which immediately demands recognition of the expression's overall equivocality:
  - Is "ego-strengthening" a generic (somewhat antiquated) qualitative, umbrella term that broadly identifies an overall approach of mobilizing an individual's inner resources such that they "experience greater inner strength, mastery, self-esteem, and self-confidence" (McNeal, 2020, p. 403): a valuable and productive therapeutic approach — the modern theoretical, practical, and linguistic character of which, Michael Yapko argues (2019a, 2019b), is more accurately and appropriately denoted by the generic descriptor "empowerment".
  - Is "ego-strengthening" a specific, quantitative term, with "ego" modifying (as a sub-set) the activity denoted as "strengthening".
    - Does it centre upon the inappropriate "reification" (in the manner of Whitehead's "fallacy of misplaced concreteness") of the abstract concept, "ego"?
    - Is the intervention being delivered from an operator mind-set that seeks the reduction of a perceived "ego" deficit, or is with one seeking the enhancement of whatever "ego" strength is currently present?
- "How is the strength of that entity being measured?"; which immediately raises a number of concerns:
  - To what extent is the attribute being measured (e.g., self-esteem) related to the concept ("ego-strength") under scrutiny?
  - To what extent is the measured attribute (e.g., self-esteem) a reliable and valid index of the concept ("ego-strength") under scrutiny?
  - To what extent is the (before- and after-intervention) rating of the measured attribute (e.g., self-esteem) a reliable and valid measure of the (before- and after-intervention) "strength" of the concept ("ego") under scrutiny?

=== Experimentation ===
Setting aside the complex issues of determining precisely how a "genuinely productive experiment" might (or might not) possibly be constructed to measure its efficacy — or how, where, and upon whom a relevant, informative, and useful study might (or might not) be designed and performed — and, further, if were to be conducted, how its results might be measured and appraised, there is the even-more-significant question of the extent to which any such findings could have any practical application at all, due to the differences in contexts identified by Gorman (1974):

- Subjects of "hypnosis under experimental conditions" are "participating voluntarily" in an experiment, have "a detached state of mind", and are not "intimately and vitally" affected by the results of the experiment.
- Subjects of "hypnosis under therapeutic conditions" are undergoing therapy, and are "acutely aware of the fact that the results of therapy may have a most important effect upon [their] subsequent feelings of well-being"; "[their] state of mind is therefore not detached, but, on the contrary, [they are] both anxious and critical".

In 1977, in perhaps the only investigation that ever attempted to measure the efficacy of Hartland's monologue within a clinical setting, Calnan's study reported that the ten psychiatric patients (test population: 40) who had received Hartland's monologue, under hypnosis, 12 times in 6 weeks, demonstrated (per medium of "psychological tests") considerable progress (i.e., compared to the other 30); the most interesting/relevant outcome of his interventions was that:

"[all of the] subjects who received Hartland's entire treatment procedure ... reported feeling more relaxed and self-confident. Very often they described their changes in exactly the same words as those used by Hartland in his ego strengthening suggestions and yet none of the subjects mentioned or seemed aware of their origin." (Calnan, 1977, p. 117, emphasis added).

== Clinical utility ==
Hartland's overall "ego-strengthening" approach, clinical strategies, explanations, and his descriptions of the suggestive sequences (for within-hypnotic influence and post-hypnotic influence) he delivered in practice, have made a considerable contribution to modern hypnotherapeutic practice. Despite the obvious difficulties in determining its clinical efficacy, Hartland's approach clearly satisfies the APA's tripartite criteria for clinical utility:

- Generalizability: "the extent to which an effect of a treatment is robust and therefore will be replicated even when details of the context ... [such as] patients’ characteristics, health care professionals’ characteristics, [etc.] ... are altered."
- Feasibility: "the extent to which a treatment can be delivered to patients in the actual setting", including considerations such as "the acceptability of the intervention to potential patients", "patients' ability and willingness to comply with the requirements of the intervention", and "the ease of administration of the intervention".
- Cost considerations: these include "the direct, indirect, short-term, and long-term costs to the patient, to the professional ... [including] the cost of any technology or equipment involved in the intervention, and the cost of training ... and to the health care system, as well as the costs associated with withholding treatment" as well as the "cost savings" that might accrue from the intervention's "prevention of future disorders" or its "mak[ing] other treatments unnecessary".

=== Hartland's overall approach ===
There are many reports of hypnotherapeutic interventions, directed at a wide range of conditions, that describe the valuable contribution that the adoption of an overall ego-strengthening approach has made to their treatment outcomes, in relation to building confidence, enhancing self-esteem, facilitating behavioural change, arousing dormant resources, promoting overall well-being, increasing a sense of self-efficacy and self-empowerment, and strengthening the sense of an internal locus of control: including, for instance, Melzack & Perry (1975); Deabler (1976); Gardner (1976); Stanton (1977); Stanton (1979); Newey (1986); Palan & Chandwani (1989); Stanton (1989); T.X. Barber (1990a); T.X. Barber (1990b); Hammond (1990b); Hammond (1990c); Watkins (1990); Darken (1992); Stanton (1993); Bennett (1994); Vanderlinden & Vandereycken (1994); Moss & Oakley (1997); Daniel (1999); Frederick & McNeal (1999); Hornyak (1999); Linden (1999); Lynch (1999); Mutter (1999); T.X. Barber (2000); J. Barber (2001); Gafner & Benson (2001); Phillips (2001); Lavertue, Kumar & Pekala (2002); Stafrace (2004); McNeal (2007); Chandrashekhar (2016); Gafner (2016); Handel & Néron (2017); Moss & Willmarth (2017); Daitch (2018); Shenefelt (2018); and Zare, et al. (2026), etc., etc.

=== Hartland's published monologue ===
The literature also contains many reports of Hartland's published ego-strengthening monologue being successfully applied, precisely as written, to a wide range of conditions: including, for instance, Rose (1967); Basker, Anderson and Dalton (1978); Wakeman and Kaplan (1978); Freeman and Baxby (1982); Gould and Tissler (1984); Finkelstein (1991); Torem (1995); and Spiegel (1996), etc., etc.

== See also ==
- Abulia – Neurological symptom of lack of will or initiative
- Akrasia – Lack of self-control
- Autosuggestion – Psychological technique related to the placebo effect
- Cognitive behavioral therapy – Type of therapy to improve mental health
- Ego depletion – Psychological theory
- Enkrateia – Virtuous self-control
- Émile Coué – French psychologist (1857–1926)
- Emmanuel Movement – Psychotherapy approach, 1906–1931
- Empowerment – Autonomy and self-determination in people and communities
- Eudaimonia – Human flourishing in ancient Greek philosophy
- Help-seeking – Theory in psychology
- Hypnosis – State of increased suggestibility
- Hypnotherapy – Type of complementary and alternative medicine
- Learned helplessness – Psychological behavior
- Learned optimism – Concept in positive psychology
- Locus of control – Concept in psychology
- Mind–body interventions – Health and fitness interventions
- Nancy School – French school of psychotherapy from 1866
- Neurasthenia – Psychological term
- Optimism – Positive mental attitude
- Personal development – Activities that develop a person's capabilities and potential
- Positive psychology – Approach of psychological scientific study
- Psychasthenia
- Psychological resilience – Ability to mentally cope with a crisis
- Psychosomatic medicine – Interdisciplinary medical field exploring various influences on bodily processes
- Psychotherapy – Clinically applied psychology for desired behavior change
- Psychoneuroimmunology – Area of study within psychosomatic medicine
- Self-efficacy – Psychology concept
- Self-esteem – Human emotional need
- Self-help – Self-guided improvement
- Suggestion – Psychological process of guiding a person
- Systemic therapy – Psychotherapeutic discipline
- Type of therapy (by intent) – Attempted medical remediation of a health problem
- Vis medicatrix naturae – Latin phrase affirming the body's self-healing nature
- Well-being – Measure of how well someone's life is going
