= Henri-Étienne Beaunis =

French physiologist, psychologist, and founding member of the Nancy School of Hypnosis

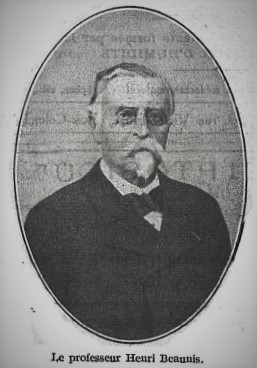
Henri-Étienne Beaunis

Henri-Étienne Beaunis (2 August 1830 – 20 July 1921) was a French physiologist and psychologist. He defended the thesis of the Nancy School in the field of hypnosis. He is known for his works on anatomy, physiology, psychology and hypnosis.

== Childhood ==
Henri-Étienne Beaunis was born in Amboise in 1830. The name on his birth certificate is Henry-Étienne Beaunis, but most of his publications were made under the name of Henri-Étienne Beaunis. His mother, who was married to a government employee, had to leave Rouen when the city became threatened by the July revolution. When his mother returned to his father, she left Beaunis in Touraine under the care of his grandmother. When he was very young, he started to be interested to reading and arts. He had great successes at school and obtained successively the Baccalauréat ès lettres (1848) and the Baccalauréat ès sciences physiques (1849).

== Studies ==
He studied in Rouen until he began his medical specialisation in Paris. He obtained his medical doctoral degree in Montpellier in 1856. His thesis was focused on habits and was published under the name of De l'habitude en général. He presented his vision of habits and pleaded for people to see habits as ways of improving ourselves, and not as repetitive acts that allows us to please ourselves in rest and happiness. His father was not an enthusiast for the arts and encouraged him to pursue the path of medicine. Henri-Étienne Beaunis chose medicine and enlisted himself in the French army. He served in Algeria many times and came back to France with the title of médecin-major de deuxième classe in 1860. His work Anatomie générale et physiologie du système lymphatique was presented as a thesis for his aggrégation de médecine in anatomical and physiological sciences. This was an obligatory step in France to become a professor. He then became professor at the Faculty of Medicine of the University of Strasbourg.

== Early career ==
Five years after he became professor at Strasbourg, he published a book called Nouveaux éléments d'anatomie descriptive et d'embryologie with his colleague Abel Bouchard, who was also a medic in the army. The book was a synthesis of the anatomical and embryological knowledge for students of science and medicine. The authors used their knowledge of German to stay in touch with the latest discoveries, which were often published in German during this period. Beaunis wrote the sections on osteology, articulations, myology, viscera, senses, the human body in general, and embryology. Bouchard wrote the sections on angiology and neurology.

In 1870 and 1871, Beaunis underwent the Franco-Prussian War which led to the French side losing a part of Alsace-Lorraine. In 1871, he published in the Gazette médicale de Paris extracts of his diary describing his life during this period and more specifically during the Siege of Strasbourg. He described the intellectual climate that was developing before the war and the progressive opening to scientific dialogs both in Germany and France, especially in the fields of physiology and medicine. After his involvement as a medic, the Faculty of Medicine of Strasbourg was transferred to Nancy, where he obtained the chair of Physiology, following the disappearance of E. Küss, who was the previous holder.

== Works in physiology and anatomy ==
In 1874, he published his observations on a case of Situs inversus, a particular condition in which internal organs are misplaced in the body. His most massive work of this period was Nouveaux Élements de physiologie humaine comprenant les principes de la physiologie comparée et de la physiologie générale, a book that synthesises the knowledge in physiology at that time, including knowledge in physiological psychology, which was usually left to philosophers. Supplementary editions were published in 1881 and 1888. In 1877, in Nancy, he published (with Abel Bouchard) Précis d'anatomie et de dissection; a work he considered to be a sequel to Nouveaux éléments d'anatomie descriptive et d'embryologie.

Since the publication of Nouveaux Élements de physiologie humaine, Beaunis had demonstrated his interest in including psychological processes in the general field of physiology. In 1884, he started publishing texts that explored this question specifically. He published De la justesse et de la fausseté de la voix, a treatise that exposes amongst other ideas the idea that speech in man is the very complex expression of communicative capacities that are present in other animals and that speech is generated through mechanical processes involving mouth and throat muscles. His laboratory started being well equipped in 1876, after which he started publishing scientific results that were collectively published in 1884. This collective work is called Recherches expérimentales sur les conditions de l'activité cérébrale et sur la physiologie des nerfs and describes some of the works of Albert Küss, Albert René, Maxime Drouot, Charles Mayard and Eugène Gley. The majority of these works had been published in the Revue médicale de l'Est or the Gazette des hôpitaux. The experiments described were performed in the laboratory of Beaunis. They consist in studying cerebral physiology, which would today be called neurophysiology. The research performed during this period in the laboratory include works on pneumotherapy, the physiological effects of nicotine, diuretic agents, the effects of cognitive processes on pulse, aneurysms, respiration, muscle contractions and reaction time to sensorial stimuli.

His works in physiology led him to gain interest in hypnosis. He joined Ambroise-Auguste Liébeault, Hippolyte Bernheim and Jules Liégeois to defend the theses of the Nancy Schoolof Hypnosis against those of The Salpêtrière School of Hypnosis of Jean Martin Charcot. The Nancy School thought that hypnosis was a state similar to sleep produced by suggestion, while the Salpêtrière School thought that it was a pathological state similar to hysteria. In 1887, he published Le somnambulisme provoqué: études physiologiques et psychologiques that he originally wanted to include in Recherches expérimentales sur les conditions de l'activité cérébrale et sur la physiologie des nerfs. The pressure of his editors encouraged him to create a separate work.

After this publication on hypnosis, he continued to publish general works in physiology and psychophysiology. In 1889, he published Les sensations internes, a synthesis of internal senses other than the five classically studied senses which underlie physiological mechanisms. In 1890, he published L'évolution du système nerveux. In 1889, he founded at the Sorbonne the first French psychology laboratory. In 1894, he founded with Alfred Binet the scientific journal L'Année psychologique. In 1893, he published in his Travaux du Laboratoire de Psychologie Physiologique, a description of two cases of synesthesia.

== Works on art ==
Henri-Étienne Beaunis maintained throughout from his college years to his death a passion for arts. In 1917, he completed a work started at least in 1891 that consisted in traducing the theatre of Eschyle. He also published some novels under the pseudonym of Paul Abaur. He died at Le Cannet.

== Memoir ==
Serge Nicolas, who wrote the most complete biography of Henri-Étienne Beaunis, had access to a small part of the memoir written by Henri-Étienne Beaunis. The complete memoir has not been recovered yet. In the biography he wrote, Serge Nicolas formulates the wish that his writing be recovered and made public.

== Works ==
- De l'habitude en général, 1856
- L'Italienne, scènes des guerres contemporaines, drame en 1 acte et 2 tableaux en vers, 1859
- Anatomie générale et physiologie du système lymphatique, 1863
- Nouveaux éléments d'anatomie descriptive et d'embryologie, 1868, J.B. Baillière et fils, eds. (co-written with Abel Bouchard)
- Tratado elemental de Anatomía descriptiva y de preparaciones anatómicas, 1869 (co-written with Alexandre Jamain, Abel Bouchard and Eusebio Rogelio Casas de Batista)
- Impressions de campagne (1870–1871), 1871–1872, Gazette médicale de Paris (réed. Beaunis, H.E. (1887) Impressions de campagne (1870-1871). Félix Alcan, Berger-Levrault et Cie, eds.)
- Programme du cours complémentaire de physiologie fait à la Faculté de médecine de Strasbourg: semestre d'été 1869, 1872
- Remarques sur un cas de transposition générale des viscères, 1874, Berger-Levrault & Cie., eds
- Remarques sur la transposition des viscères, 1874, Revue médicale de l'Est
- Les Principes de la physiologie, par H. Beaunis, professeur de physiologie à la Faculté de médecine de Nancy. Leçon d'ouverture, 1875, Berger-Levrault, eds.
- Nouveaux Élements de physiologie humaine comprenant les principes de la physiologie comparée et de la physiologie générale. J.B. Baillière et fils, eds. (reed. in 1881 and 1888)
- Précis d'anatomie et de dissection, 1877, J.B. Baillière et fils, eds. (co-written with Abel Bouchard)
- Compendio de anatomía y diseccion, 1877, Moya y Plaza ed. (co-written with Abel Bouchard and Moya y Plaza)
- Nuevos elementos de anatomía descriptiva y de embriología, Volume 2, 1878, Moya y Plaza ed. (co-written with Abel Bouchard and Moya y Plaza, traduced by Gerardo F. Jeremías y Devesa)
- Claude Bernard, leçon d'ouverture du cours de physiologie, 1878, Berger-Levrault eds.
- Sur la comparaison du temps de réaction des différentes sensations, 1883. Revue Philosophique 15:611-620
- L'expérimentation en psychologie par le somnambulisme provoqué, 1885. Revue Philosophique 20:1-36, 113–115
- Influence de la durée de l'attente sur le temps de réactions, 1885. Revue Philosophique 20:330-331
- Suggestion à 172 jours d'intervalle, 1885. Revue Philosophique 20:332
- Un fait de suggestion mentale, 1885. Revue Philosophique 21:204
- De la justesse et de la fausseté de la voix, 1884. J.-B. Baillière et Fils, eds.
- Recherches expérimentales sur les conditions de l'activité cérébrale et sur la physiologie des nerfs, 1884. J.-B. Baillière et Fils, eds.
- Novyia osnovy fizīologīi chelovieka, 1884
- Le somnambulisme provoqué: études physiologiques et psychologiques, 1887. J.-B. Baillière et Fils, eds. (reed. L'Harmattan, 2007)
- Une expérience sur le sens musculaire, 1887. Revue Philosophique 23:328-330
- L'École du service de santé militaire de Strasbourg et la Faculté de médecine de Strasbourg de 1856 à 1870, 1888, Berger-Levrault et cie.
- Les sensations internes, 1889. Félix Alcan, ed.
- L'évolution du système nerveux, 1888. Revue scientifique 25:257-263, 361–368, 757-764
- Recherches sur la mémoire des sensations musculaires, 1888. Revue Philosophique 25:569-574
- L'évolution du système nerveux, 1889. Revue scientifique 26:8-17
- Der künstlich hervorgerufene Somnambulismus: physiologische und psychologische Studien, 1889. Deuticke, ed.
- L'évolution du système nerveux, 1890. J.B. Baillière et fils, eds.
- Les Suppliantes, d'Eschyle: drame lyrique en deux tableaux et en vers, 1891. Marpon et Flammarion, eds.
- Travaux du Laboratoire de Psychologie Physiologique, 1893–1894
- Introduction, L'Année Psychologique I, 1895.
- Contes physiologiques: Madame Mazurel, 1895. Société d'éditions littéraires, éds. (publié sous le pseudonyme Paul Abaur)
- Contribution à la psychologie du rêve, 1903. American Journal of Psychology 14:271-287
- Les fantoches sur la Côte d'Azur, fantaisie revue en 1 acte et en vers, 1908. V. Guiglion, ed.
- El sonambulismo provocado: estudios fisiológicos y psicológicos, 1908. Bailly-Baillière e hijos, eds.
- Comment fonctionne mon cerveau : essai de psychologie introspective, 1909. Revue Philosophique 67:29-40
- Le mécanisme cérébral: observations personnelles, 1910. Revue Philosophique 69:464-482
- Deux cas de lucidité télépathique, 1914. Annales des sciences psychiques, février
- Elementi di fisiologia umana comprendenti i principii di fisiologia comparata e di fisiologia general, 1916. Unione Tipografico editrice, eds.
- Oeuvres d'Eschyle, 1917. Le Cannet, ed.
- Tragédies, 1917.
- L'émotion musicale, 1918. Revue Philosophique 86:353-369.
- Heures tragiques: 1870-1871, 1914–1919, Poésies, 1919. Le Cannet, V. Guillon, eds.
- Sonnets fantaisistes: silhouettes contemporaines : octobre 1920, 1920.
- Les aveugles de naissance et le monde extérieur, 1921. Revue Philosophique XCI:15-74

== See also ==
- Hippolyte Bernheim – French physician, neurologist, and founding member of the Nancy School of Hypnosis
- Ambroise-Auguste Liébeault – French physician and founding member of the Nancy School of Hypnosis
- Jules Liégeois – French jurist, academic, and founding member of the Nancy School of Hypnosis
- The Nancy School of Hypnosis – French school of psychotherapy from 1866
- The Salpêtrière School of Hypnosis – French school of psychotherapy from 1882
