= L'Année psychologique =

- Discipline: Cognitive psychology
- Language: English

Publication details
- History: 1894–present

Standard abbreviations
- ISO 4: Année Psychol.

Indexing
- ISSN: 0003-5033 (print); 1955-2580 (web)

L'Année Psychologique (the "Annual Journal of Psychology"^{a}) is the oldest French peer-reviewed academic journal dedicated exclusively to scientific psychology. It covers cognitive psychology, experimental psychology, developmental psychology, social psychology, neuropsychology, psychopathology, and history of psychology.

== History ==
Established in 1894 by Alfred Binet, this was the first French journal for scientific psychology, and is today one of the leading journals in that field in French. It was among the first psychology journals in the world, among Philosophische Studien, established in 1881 by Wilhelm Wundt; the American Journal of Psychology, established in 1887 by Granville Stanley Hall; the Zeitschrift für Psychologie, established in 1890 by Hermann Ebbinghaus; and the Psychological Review, established in 1894 by James McKeen Cattell and James Mark Baldwin.

The history of the creation of the journal is closely associated with that of the institutionalization of French psychology. Théodule Ribot's election to the newly created chair of Experimental and Comparative Psychology at the Collège de France in 1888 is followed by the creation of the first French laboratory of experimental psychology at the Sorbonne in 1889, under the direction of Henri-Étienne Beaunis. The laboratory's research is first published in a journal titled "Travaux du Laboratoire de Psychologie Physiologique" (with 2 volumes published in 1893 and 1894). Alfred Binet, who joined the laboratory in 1891, suggests overhauling the laboratory's communication by effectively creating a new journal. With Beaunis' agreement, he established L'Année Psychologique in 1894 to boost the outreach of the laboratory's research.

The journal's orientation and reputation is associated, through its successive directors, to that of the Institute of Psychology of the University of Paris, founded by Henri Piéron in 1920 and expanded by Paul Fraisse.

In 1984, L'Année Psychologique became a quarterly journal of experimental psychology.

In 2012, it officially became an international bilingual journal (French/English), taking the subtitle Topics in Cognitive Psychology.

== Directors ==
Since its creation in 1894, the journal had directors such as Alfred Binet, Henri Piéron, and Paul Fraisse, major figures that have set the scientific orientation of the journal.

- 1894–1911 : Alfred Binet is director.
- 1912–1964 : Henri Piéron replaces Binet and remains director until 1964.
- 1947–1994 : Paul Fraisse joins Henri Piéron as director, and will remain until 1994.
- 1980–1984 : Georges Noizet shares the direction with Paul Fraisse.
- 1988–1994 : Juan Segui shares the direction with Paul Fraisse.
- 1995–2003 : Juan Segui becomes the sole director.
- 2003–2005 : Ludovic Ferrand shares the direction with Juan Segui.
- 2006–2017: Ludovic Ferrand becomes scientific director (until 2017), and Serge Nicolas becomes the editorial director.
- 2017: Pascale Colé becomes scientific director.

== Notes ==
Though the French title literally translates to The Psychological Year, the official English title is Annual Journal of Psychology.
