= Paris Institute of Psychology =

Institute of Psychology
- Type: Graduate school
- Established: 1920
- Parent institution: Paris Cité University
- President: Isabelle Jambaqué-Aubourg
- Academic staff: Faculty of Social Sciences and Humanities
- Address: 71 avenue Édouard-Vaillant, Boulogne-Billancourt, France
- Website: https://psychologie.u-paris.fr

The Institute of Psychology (French: Institut de psychologie, IP) is a graduate school of psychology and constitutes the department of psychology of the Paris Cité University. It is currently located at the Centre Henri-Piéron, 71 avenue Édouard-Vaillant, Boulogne-Billancourt. Being the birthplace of French psychology, the institute was founded in 1920 by Henri Piéron, with the mission of providing psychology education and a center for research. It is the oldest psychology-specific education institution in France. The last three stories of the 6-stories building are assigned to research laboratories, and the basement hosts the oldest psychology-dedicated library in France (which received the CollEx label of excellence).

== History ==
Created in 1920 by Henri Piéron, the Institute of Psychology is the first university institute (the term 'institute', as opposed to 'school', underlines the important focus on research activity) of the University of Paris. It was meant to gather psychologists from the University of Paris, the Collège de France, and the Ecole Pratique des Hautes Etudes, and delivered a one-year diploma of psychological studies with specialities in "Psychology", "Pedagogy", or "Applied Psychology".

In 1947, Daniel Lagache implements a two-year psychology bachelor's degree with specialities in "General Psychology", "Child Psychology", "Social Life Psychology", and "Psychophysiology".

In 1959, the institute moves to the building of the Sociétés savantes, on Serpente street.

In 1965, Paul Fraisse becomes the institute's director.

In 1999, as part of a plan to regroup all the research laboratories scattered across Paris, the institute gets transferred to its current location in Boulogne-Billancourt.

In 2020, the Institute of Psychology joins the Faculty of Social Sciences and Humanities of the Paris Cité University.

== Curriculum ==
=== Social Sciences ===
- Bachelor of Psychology
- Master of Psychology (professional)
  - Occupational Psychology
  - Clinical Psychology
- Master of Psychology (research)
  - Individual, social, environment
  - Psychopathology : emotions, affects, behaviors, psychic processes

=== Life Sciences ===
- Master of Psychology (professional)
  - Neuropsychology
  - Developmental psychology
- Master of Psychology (research)
  - Cognitive Psychology
- European Master (in collaboration with the universities of Valence, Coimbra, Bologna et Barcelona)
  - Work, Organizational, and Personnel Psychology

The doctorate degree is delivered through within the doctoral school Cognition, comportement, conduites humaines (ED 261) which includes 18 research laboratories.

== Directors ==
- 1920 : The institute is originally directed by a board including Henri Piéron (EPHE), founding member until 1951, as well as Henri Delacroix (Sorbonne, Lettres), Georges Dumas (Sorbonne, Lettres), Étienne Rabaud (Sorbonne, Sciences) and Pierre Janet (Collège de France).
- 1952 : Paul Fraisse replaces Henri Piéron with a director board including Daniel Lagache (Sorbonne, lettres), Jean Delay (Faculté de médecine), and Pierre-Paul Grassé (Sorbonne, Sciences).
- 1960 : Daniel Lagache steps back from co-directorship.
- 1961 : Paul Fraisse becomes the only director.
- 1969-1993 : The institute splits into the 'Institute of Psychology' proper and the 'Unit of Formation and Research (UFR) - Institut de Psychologie'
  - (Institute) 1968-1974 : Hélène Gratiot Alphandéry
  - (Institute) 1974-1980 : Claude Lévy-Leboyer
  - (Institute) 1981- 1988 : Roland Doron
  - (Institute) 1988-1992 : Jean-Claude Sperandio
  - (UFR) 1969-1973 : Paul Fraisse
  - (UFR) 1973-1974 : Pierre Oléron
  - (UFR) 1974-1977 : Guy Durandin
  - (UFR) 1977-1981 : Germaine de Montmollin
  - (UFR) 1981-1985 : Colette Chiland
  - (UFR) 1985-1989 : Hervé Beauchesne
  - (UFR) 1989-1993 : Pierre Coslin
- 1993-1998 : Roger Lécuyer
- 1998-2002 : Serban Ionescu
- 2002-2007 : Jean-Didier Bagot
- 2007-2012 : François Marty
- 2012-2017 : Ewa Drozda-Senkowska
- 2017-2022 : Isabelle Jambaqué-Aubourg
