= Hypnotic susceptibility =

Measure of how easily a person can be hypnotized

Hypnotic susceptibility measures how easily a person can be hypnotized. Several types of scales are used; the most common are the Harvard Group Scale of Hypnotic Susceptibility (administered predominantly to large groups of people) and the Stanford Hypnotic Susceptibility Scales (administered to individuals).

No scale can be seen as completely reliable due to the nature of hypnosis. It has been argued that no person can be hypnotized if they do not want to be; therefore, a person who scores very low may not want to be hypnotized, making the actual test score averages lower than they otherwise would be.

== Hypnotic depth scales ==
Hypnotic susceptibility scales, which mainly developed in experimental settings, were preceded by more primitive scales, developed within clinical practice, which were intended to infer the "depth" or "level" of "hypnotic trance" on the basis of various subjective, behavioural or physiological changes.

The Scottish surgeon James Braid, attempted to distinguish, in various ways, between different levels of the hypnotic state. Subsequently, the French neurologist Jean-Martin Charcot also made a similar distinction between what he termed the lethargic, somnambulistic, and cataleptic levels of the hypnotic state.

However, Ambroise-Auguste Liébeault and Hippolyte Bernheim introduced more complex hypnotic "depth" scales, based on a combination of behavioural, physiological and subjective responses, some of which were due to direct suggestion and some of which were not. In the first few decades of the 20th century, these early clinical "depth" scales were superseded by more sophisticated "hypnotic susceptibility" scales based on experimental research. The most influential were the Davis-Husband and Friedlander–Sarbin scales developed in the 1930s.

== Hypnotic susceptibility scales ==
=== Friedlander–Sarbin Scale ===
A major precursor of the Stanford Scales, the Friedlander–Sarbin scale was developed in 1938 by Theodore R. Sarbin and consisted of similar test items to those used in subsequent experimental scales.

=== Stanford Scales ===
The Stanford Scale was developed by André Muller Weitzenhoffer and Ernest R. Hilgard in 1959. The Scale consists of three Forms: A, B, and C. Similar to the Harvard Group Scale, each Form consists of 12 items of progressive difficulty and usually takes fifty minutes to complete. Each form consists of motor and cognitive tasks but vary in their respective intended purpose. The administrator scores each form individually.

==== Form A ====
Based upon the scale developed by Joseph Friedlander and Theodore Sarbin (1938), this form was developed to measure susceptibility to hypnosis with items increasing in difficulty in order to yield a score. The higher the score, the more responsive one is to hypnosis. Following a standardized hypnotic induction, the hypnotized individual is given suggestions pertaining to the list below.

Item number	Test suggestion and responses
1	Postural sway
2	Eye closure
3	Hand lowering (left)
4	Immobilization (right arm)
5	Finger lock
6	Arm rigidity (left arm)
7	Hands moving together
8	Verbal inhibition (name)
9	Hallucination (fly)
10	Eye catalepsy
11	Post-hypnotic (changes chairs)
12	Amnesia

==== Form B ====
Form B was designed to be used as a follow-up to Form A when doing experiments involving a second session of hypnosis. The items are similar but are changed somewhat (e.g. the use of the opposite hand in a particular item). The changes were made to "prevent memory from the first exerting too great an influence upon the recall of specific tasks..."

==== Form C ====
Created a few years after Forms A and B, Form C contains some items from Form B, but includes more difficult items for "when subjects are being selected for advanced tests in which knowledge of their capacity to experience more varied items is required" (pgs v-vi Weitzenhoffer & Hilgard 1962). Following a standardized hypnotic induction, the hypnotized individual is given suggestions pertaining to the list below.

Item number	Test suggestion and responses
0	Eye closure (not scored)
1	Hand lowering (right hand)
2	Moving hands apart
3	Mosquito hallucination
4	Taste hallucination
5	Arm rigidity (right arm)
6	Dream
7	Age regression (school)
8	Arm immobilization
9	Anosmia to ammonia
10	Hallucinated voice
11	Negative visual hallucination (Three Boxes)
12	Post-hypnotic amnesia

In more modern experiments, a scent such as peppermint has been used in place of ammonia for Item 9.

=== Harvard Group Scale ===
Ronald Shor and Emily Carota Orne developed the Harvard Group Scale in 1962. It consists of 12 items of progressive difficulty (as defined, psychometrically, by the percentage of subjects in a normative sample that report experiencing each particular item) and usually takes around forty-five minutes to complete. The items usually consist of motor tasks and cognitive tasks with the motor tasks being easier to complete. The average score is 5 out of 12. The test is self-scored leaving it open to criticism concerning the validity of the scores.

==== Hypnotic Induction Profile ====
The Hypnotic Induction Profile (HIP) or the eye roll test, first proposed by Herbert Spiegel, is a simple test to loosely determine if a person is susceptible to hypnosis. A person is asked to roll their eyes upward. The degree to which the iris and cornea are seen is measured. The less of these parts of the eye observed, the more hypnotically susceptible a person is. Research has shown that the scale may not carry as strong a relationship with other hypnotic scales as originally thought. More recent research has found significant correlations with absorption scales, and dissociative experiences.

=== Other scales ===
Many other tests are not widely used because they are usually seen as less reliable than the Stanford Scale and Harvard Group Scale. Many professionals think that these tests produce results because they involve attentional control, and that a certain level of concentration is required to be hypnotized.

Conversely, concentration can be something induced through the use of hypnosis instead of a "fuel" used to get hypnosis running.

== Susceptibility ==
Individuals of extremely high hypnotizability tend to have distinctive characteristics outside of hypnosis. In 1981, Sherl Wilson and T X Barber reported that most of the extremely high hypnotizables were in a single group, whom they termed "fantasizers". The fantasizers exhibited a cluster of traits consisting of: 1) fantasizing much of the time, 2) reporting their imagery was as vivid as real perceptions, 3) having physical responses to their imagery, 4) having an earlier than average age for first childhood memory, 5) recalling "imaginary playmates" from childhood, and 6) having grown up with parents who encouraged imaginative play. In 1991, Deirdre Barrett examined a larger group of extremely high hypnotizables and confirmed that about 60% fit Barber and Wilson's characterization of fantasizers while 40% were what she termed "dissociaters" who: 1) experienced daydreaming mostly as "spacing out" and not remembering what had been going on for periods of time, 2) had later than average ages for first memories, and 3) had parents who had been harshly punitive and/or who had experienced other childhood traumas. Fantasizers tended to experience hypnosis as being much like other imaginative activities while dissociaters reported it was unlike anything they'd ever experienced. Individuals with dissociative identity disorder have the highest hypnotizability of any clinical group, followed by those with post-traumatic stress disorder.

== See also ==
- Fantasy prone personality
- Nancy School
- Salpêtrière School of Hypnosis
- Suggestibility § Hypnosis
