= Serge Nicolas =

French professor of psychology and author

- Born: 16 December 1962 (age 63); Paris
- Education: PhD (Psychology, 1992), Grenoble II; PhD (Philosophy, 2007), Université Paris VIII
- Scientific career
- Fields: Psychology
- Workplaces: Institute of Psychology, University of Paris

Serge Nicolas is a French professor of psychology at the Institute of Psychology of the University of Paris since 2003. He specializes in the study of memory and history of psychology. He is also chief-editor of the journal L'Année psychologique, and a distinguished member of the Institut Universitaire de France since 2016.

== Career ==
Nicolas earned his doctorate in psychology in 1992, on a thesis titled "Memory and its manifestations: from its implicit expression to its explicit actualization" (supervised by Guy Tiberghien) and became associate professor the same year at the University of Paris. He became full professor there in 2003, and earned a second PhD in philosophy in 2007 from the Université Paris VIII, on a thesis titled "Academic philosophy in France from the Revolution to the Restauration (1789-1830): History of the foundation of a political philosophy based on psychology" (supervised by Patrice Vermeren).

Nicolas' research focuses primarily on cognitive psychology, with a particular interest in memory, as well as on the history of psychology, with several hundred publications on these topics. Beyond the publication, translation, and re-edition of academic books, Nicolas is also the curator of the psychology museum at the Institute of Psychology of the University of Paris, organizing exhibitions in which he showcases private as well as the University's historical pieces.

His editorial positions include the directorship of the peer-reviewed academic journal L'Année psychologique, as well as of the Psychological Encyclopedia at L'Harmattan.

Nicolas has supervised seven PhD students, including Alessandro Guida (on Long-term Working Memory, defended in 2006), Gaën Plancher (on false memories, defended in 2009), Yannick Gounden (on the distinctiveness effect in memory, defended in 2012), and Dominique Makowski (on the paradox of fiction, defended in 2018).

He is currently a member of the Memory and Cognition Lab at the Institute of Psychology of the University of Paris.

== Selected bibliography ==
Serge Nicolas is the author of several books, including:

- Histoire de la psychologie, Dunod, 2001
- Mémoire et conscience, Armand Colin, 2003
- La psychologie cognitive, Armand Colin, 2003
- Les maladies de la mémoire, In Press, 2007
- Histoire de la psychologie scientifique, De Boeck, 2008
- Introduction à la psychologie cognitive, In Press, 2009
- Études d'histoire de la psychologie, L'Harmattan, 2009
