= Roger Russell =

Psychologist from the United States and United Kingdom (1914–1998)

Roger Wolcott Russell, FASSA FACE (1914–1998) was an American biological psychologist who worked in Australia, the UK and the USA. He served as Vice-Chancellor of Flinders University (becoming the second overall in its history) in South Australia from 1972–1979.

== Background and education ==
Russell was born in Worcester, Massachusetts in 1914. He obtained a BSc followed by an MSc at Clark University where he worked with Walter Samuel Hunter.

He then proceeded to the University of Virginia where he earned his PhD in 1939.

== Teaching and military service ==
He taught briefly at the University of Nebraska and Michigan State College but when the United States entered the war he joined the United States Air Force where he held a number of teaching and research positions.

After the war, he returned to the US and held a post at the University of Pittsburgh. He then was awarded a Fulbright Program scholarship to the Institute of Psychiatry in London and was named Professor and Head of the Department of Psychology at University College London where he stayed for seven years (1950-1957) before returning to the USA.

== Later career ==
In London he became active in the International Union of Psychological Science (IUPsyS). When he returned to the US he was first elected to the executive committee of the IUPsyS (1957-1960) and became its secretary-general in 1960, a position he held until 1966. He was the treasurer of IUPsyS from 1966 to 1969, and then president from 1969 to 1972. He remained on the executive committee following his presidency until 1980.

== Awards ==
- 1960: Honorary Fellow, British Psychological Society
