= Nancy School =

French school of psychotherapy from 1866

The Nancy School was a French hypnosis-centered school of psychotherapy. The origins of the thoughts were brought about by Ambroise-Auguste Liébeault in 1866, in Nancy, France. Through his publications and therapy sessions he was able to gain the attention/support from Hippolyte Bernheim: another Nancy physician that further evolved Liébeault's thoughts and practices to form what is known as the Nancy School.

It is referred to as the Nancy School to distinguish it from the antagonistic "Paris School" that was centred on the hysteria-centred hypnotic research of Jean-Martin Charcot at the Salpêtrière Hospital in Paris.

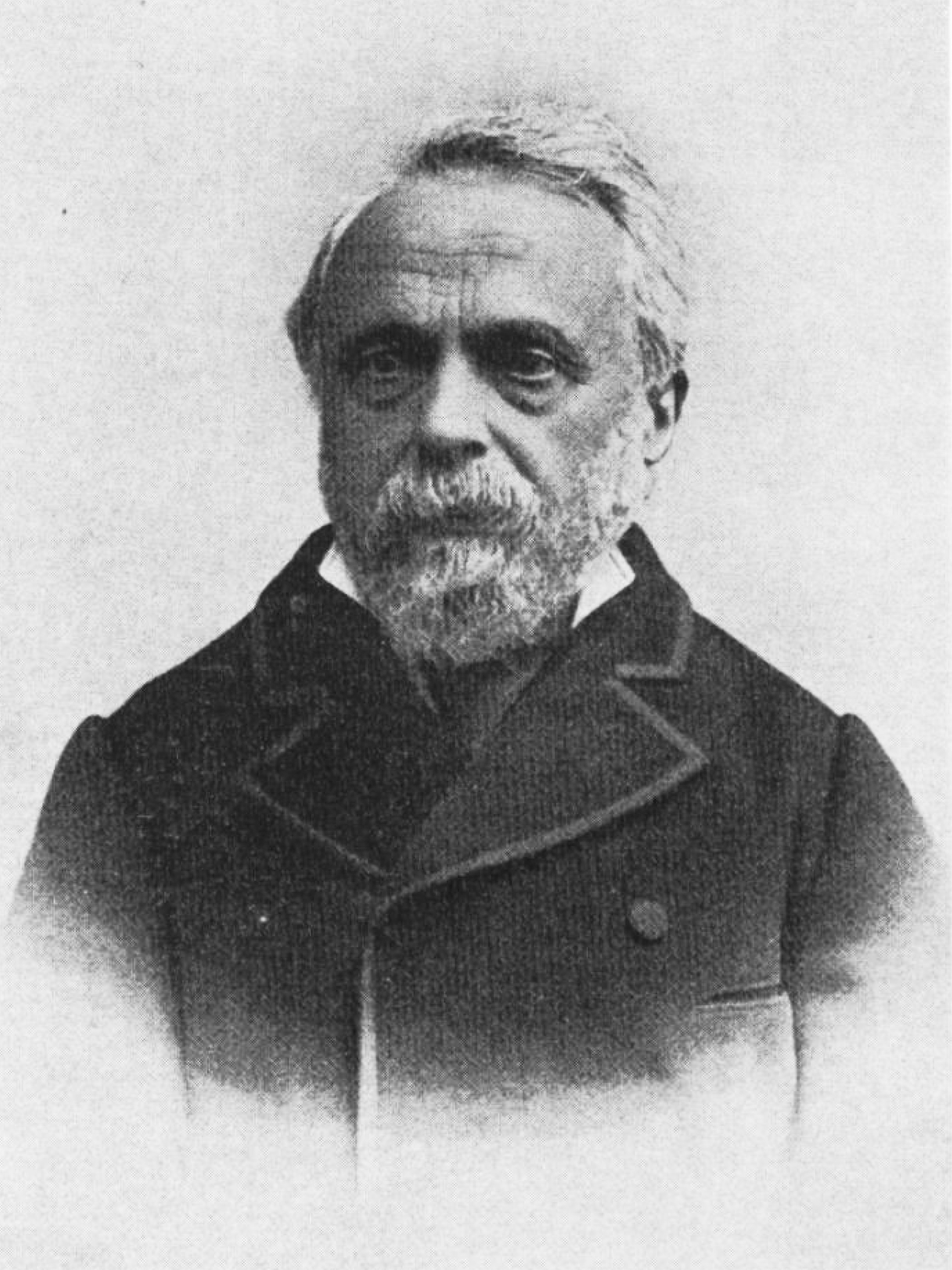
Ambroise-Auguste Liébeault.

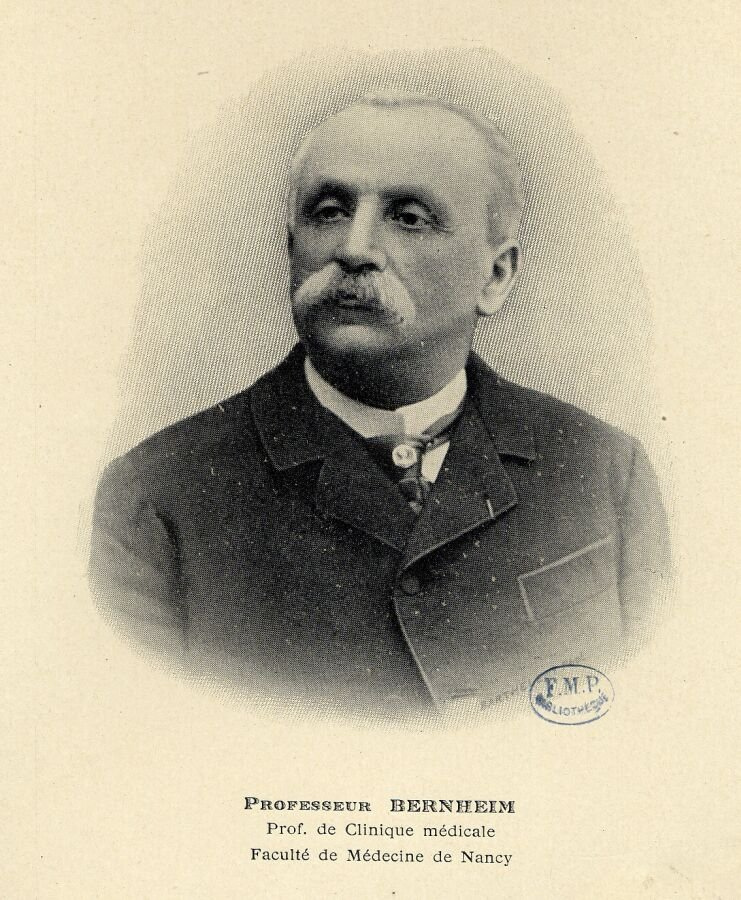
Hippolyte Bernheim.

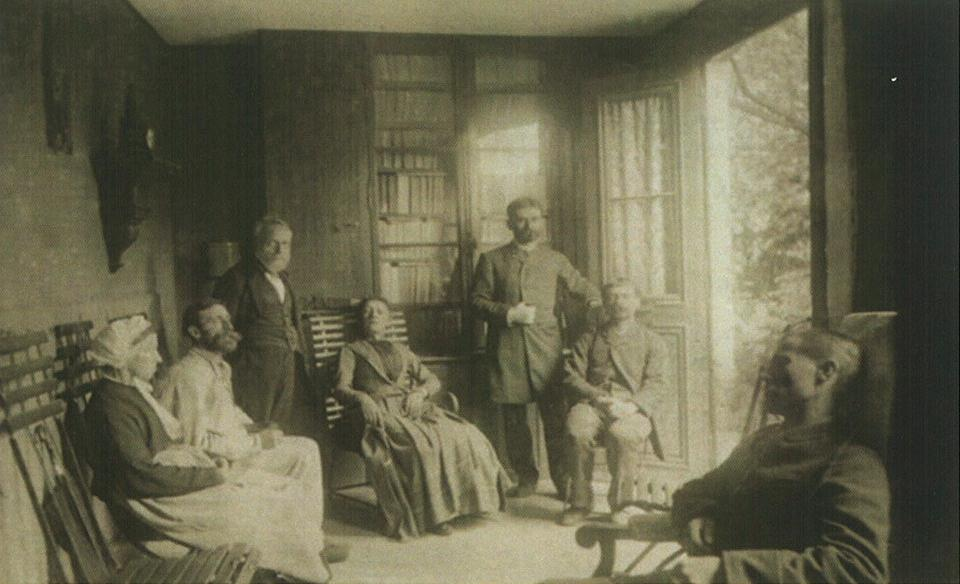
Liébeault (standing, at left) in his clinique in Nancy in 1873.

== Origins ==
Ambroise-Auguste Liébeault (1823–1904)

Liébeault was born to a peasant family in Farrières France. While expected to become a priest, he rather started his medical studies at Strasbourg, where he obtained his medical degree in 1850. At Strasbourg, he stumbled upon an old book about animal magnetism and became fascinated with it.

He moved to Nancy, France in 1860 and opened up his own clinic. Having finally established a successful practice, his thoughts turned back to that book on animal magnetism and he decided to start experimenting with hypnotic therapies. He did this by offering his patients a strange bargain: they could either continue their standard methods of treatment and continue their usual fee or they could be treated hypnotically, through suggestion, for free. Naturally, at first, many patients stuck by their standard methods because hypnosis at that time was still controversial. As more and more patients started receiving the hypnotic treatment and spreading news of its success, Liébeault became known as "Good Father Liébeault."

In 1866 he published his first book titled Du sommeil et des états analogues, considérés surtout du point de vue de l'action du moral sur le physique (Sleep and its analogous states considered from the perspective of the action of the mind upon the body) that focused on the similarities between induced sleep (or trance) and natural sleep, the features of the hypnotic state, how the induction of sleep relates to the nervous system, and the phenomena of hallucinations. Within this theory, he labeled the key difference between sleep and the hypnotic state to be "produced by suggestion and concentration on the idea of sleep and that the patient was "en rapport" with the hypnotist." This book was largely ignored by the medical profession due to the fact that it was obscurely written and sold very few copies. However, Liébeault's theory on the hypnotic state that he devised in this book attracted the attention of a prominent Nancy physician, and soon to be student of Liébeault himself, Hippolyte Bernheim.

Hippolyte Bernheim (1840–1919)

Bernheim, born in Alsace, received his medical degree from Strasbourg for internal medicine, specializing in heart diseases and typhoid fever. From hearing of the reputation Liébeault was establishing with his work in hypnosis and from reading his first publication, Bernheim skeptically visited the "hypnotic clinic" to see for himself if all of the stories he had been hearing were true. His amazement of what was happening led him to regularly visit the clinic to learn Liébeault's methods, and eventually abandoned his practice with internal medicine to become a full-time hypnotherapist. Bernheim at first humbly became a student of Liébeault, and eventually came to study the hypnotic state on par with him as a colleague.

Bernheim was able to bring Liébeault's ideas about suggestibility to the attention of the medical world. His focus was on the patients rather than the hypnotist because he believed that the patients held the important factors to be hypnotized. He believed that every human being has the trait of suggestibility but each just varied in the degree of suggestibility. This idea became a staple in the train of thought of the Nancy doctors. He wrote these thoughts and others, such as how "suggestible patients could be successfully treated by straightforward persuasion techniques as well as by hypnosis," in his book De la Suggestion et de ses Applications à la Thérapeutique (Suggestive Therapeutics). Although Bernheim was the leading proponent of suggestion accounting for hypnotic phenomena, he never took full credit for it all. He argued that "while suggestion was proposed by Abbé Faria, and was applied by James Braid, it was perfected by Liébeault."

== Hypnotism ==
Liébeault and his followers — Henri-Étienne Beaunis, Hippolyte Bernheim, and Jules Liégeois — did not agree with the views of Charcot and the Salpêtrière hospital's school of thought. In fact they were opposed to the ideas of the hysteria-centered school of thought that was the hallmark of Jean-Martin Charcot's Paris school. Instead they believed that:

- Hypnosis is a physiological condition, which can be induced in healthy individuals. The Nancy school believed the state of mind of hypnosis was a "nonpathological psychological state of mind". This view was in direct opposition to the hysteria-centered view of hypnosis by the Paris school, which stated that hypnosis was a mental disorder.
- Everyone has a tendency to respond to suggestion, but while under hypnosis this condition is artificially increased. They believed that suggestion was a trait that could be measured and varied within the subject.
- Suggestion explains all. It is a form of automatism.

They believed that the deeply hypnotized subject responds automatically to suggestion before his intellectual centers have had time to bring their inhibitory action into play.

Liebeault, Bernheim, and the school in Nancy believed that hypnosis was due to the physiological property in the brain of suggestibility. Bernheim discovered that if he gave a subject a suggestion to return to him at ten o'clock in 13 days while under hypnosis, the subject would show up at the exact time Bernheim had suggested. The subject showed no recollection of receiving a suggestion, and stated that the "idea presented itself to his mind only at the moment at which he was required to execute it." In Bernheim's Latent Memories and Long-Term Suggestions, he proposed that post-hypnotic suggestions were a result of his subjects periodically falling into a hypnotic state and remembering the suggestions they received from him while previously under hypnosis. Below is a description of one of his experiments on post-hypnotic suggestion. "To one, I tell her during her sleep:—"Next Thursday (in five days) you will take the glass that is on the night table and put it in the suitcase that is at the foot of your bed." Three days later, having put her back to sleep, I say to her: "Do you remember what I ordered you to do?" She answers: "Yes, I must put the glass in my suitcase Thursday morning, at eight o'clock."—"Have you thought about it since I told you?"—"No"—"Think hard."—"I thought about it the following morning at eleven o'clock."—"Were you awake or asleep?"—"I was in a drowsy state." (Bernheim, 1886a, pp. 109–110)" Bernheim theorized that memories of suggestions subjects received under hypnosis were not unconscious, instead they were latent, or dormant until it is revived when the subject drifts into a hypnotic state.

On the other hand Charcot was the director of the Paris's large Salpetriere Hospital. He claimed that "hypnotizability and hysteria were aspects of the same underlying abnormal neurological condition." Therefore, he doubted the view of the Nancy school: that hypnotic susceptibility was a normal characteristic. Instead, "Charcot speculated that the root cause of hysteria lay in a hereditary, progressive, and generalized degeneracy of the nervous system that interferes with the ability to integrate and interconnect memories and ideas in the normal way." While studying hysteria in Charcot's famous patient Lucie, Charcot and Pierre Janet theorized that all post-hypnotic suggestions were performed by a "dissociated consciousness". They came to this conclusion because when Lucie would have symptoms of hysteria, she would recall childhood fears. Janet then used this research as evidence that traumatic events of the past led to the onset of symptoms of hysteria which resulted in a dissociated consciousness that was expressed in hypnotic neurosis. Charcot believed that hypnotic neurosis could be described as to follow three stages: catalepsy, lethargy, and somnambulism. These ideas were implemented into Charcot's grand theory of hypnotism. The theory of grand hypnotism was presented by Charcot to the French scientific establishment and was accepted as a legitimate study.

Bernheim countered Charcot, by stating that provoked sleep was simply a consequence of suggestion. This was the exact opposite of the belief held by Charcot that suggestion was due to provoked sleep from the disorder of hypnotic neurosis. Bernheim believed that the "..automatic execution of suggested acts could happen while awake and without somnambulism." He stated that "Sleep, which suspends the power of will and reasoning, merely facilitated the brain's acceptance of the suggested idea." This idea led Bernheim to accuse Charcot of "creating a cultural hysteria" at the Salpêtrière hospital that was in fact due to the suggestion and charisma of Charcot's showmanship. Bernheim pointed out that Charcot's subjects were aware of what was expected of them while under hypnosis, Charcot and his colleagues even discussed what they expected of the patient in front of them. This included Charcot's convulsions which he implemented as a hallmark symptom of hypnotic neurosis. Charcot's hysteria-stricken subjects gained much popularity in the hospital at Paris, and around the entire country.

In the end, around 1891 the Salpetriere protagonists admitted openly that they have been wrong. "Charcot too, admitted his errors on hypnotism and privately predicted that his theories of hysteria would not long survive him". Besides his mistakes, "Charcot was among the first to explore interactions between emotional and physical factors, and he raised the important subjects of hysteria and hypnosis out of scientific obscurity".

== Influences ==
One of the first influential researchers of hypnotism was Indo-Portuguese monk, Abbé Faria. He was a pioneer of the scientific study of hypnotism who believed hypnosis worked purely through the power of suggestion.

The Scottish surgeon James Braid, focused on the susceptibility of the subjects and not on what the hypnotist was doing. By doing this Braid was able to make a revolutionary observation and conclusion by having his subjects stare at and concentrate on a shiny object. He noticed that "the staring paralyzed the eye muscles, he concluded, and the fixed attention weakened the mind, resulting in an unusual state of the nervous system, halfway between sleep and wakefulness."

From this conclusion Braid announced this discovery as being neurohypnology, or nervous sleep. Braid also proposed that hypnosis would and could have a number of clinical uses, including being useful for surgical anaesthesia; all of which helped pave the way for the establishment of scientific hypnotism, and, because Braid approached hypnotism as a scientist and natural philosopher, he was able to move hypnotism beyond controversy and mystery, and give it a respectable face.

Bernheim was a great asset to Liébeault's studies and research on hypnotism. Unlike Liébeault, Bernheim was proficient at writing effectively and communicating all of their elaborate ideas. In the book Pioneers of Psychology, Raymond E. Fancher and Alexandra Rutherford state that "Bernheim was effective at elaborating these ideas in several books and articles that came to be identified as the main statements of the Nancy school."

== Impact ==
The research and theories produced by the Nancy School have had a great impact on our society today. Multiple research studies have shown that these techniques are safe and effective in certain situations. In 2001, Diedre Barrett stated that it is also "becoming clear that the skills one needs to respond to hypnosis are similar to those necessary to experience trance-like states in daily life." According to Kendra Cherry, "the technique has also been clinically proven to provide medical and therapeutic benefits, most notably in the reduction of pain and anxiety. It has even been suggested that hypnosis can reduce the symptoms of dementia." Various articles and research indicate that hypnosis can affect people differently depending on their state of mind. Experiments today have given us enough information to show that hypnosis and the power of suggestion can help with certain problems in daily life; whether it be trying to quit smoking or to relieve the pain of consistent headaches.

There were many influential people in the history of psychology that have been themselves influenced by the Nancy School and the concept that it believed in. With this influence many of these psychology figures have been able to accomplish great things for psychology. These figures include, but are not limited to:

- Morton Prince who has become known for his work with dissociative disorders, or multiple personality disorders.
- Auguste Forel was a Swiss myrmecologist, neuroanatomist, and psychiatrist who is most known for his "investigations into the structure of the human brain and that of ants."
- Josef Breuer who was an Austrian physician who made crucial discoveries in neurophysiology, and also helped to lay the foundation for Freud's theory of psychoanalysis with his work with Bertha Pappenheim, more commonly known as Anna O.
- Sigmund Freud who was an Austrian neurologist, and studied with Bernheim, has become to be known as "the founding father of psychoanalysis." Freud was able to translate Bernheim's first two books on hypnotism and suggestion, arguing in his preface to the first (1888) that hypnotism linked up with "familiar phenomena of normal psychological life and sleep". His visit to Nancy to see what he called "Bernheim's astonishing experiments" gave him "the profoundest impression of the possibility that there could be powerful mental processes which nevertheless remained hidden from the consciousness of man". Freud read about the ideas of both Charcot and Bernheim and used hypnosis as a therapeutic method in his and Breuer's Studies on Hysteria (1895).
- Émile Coué developed the Coué Method, and is sometimes considered to have represented a second Nancy School.

== See also ==
- Autosuggestion – Psychological technique related to the placebo effect
- Henri-Étienne Beaunis – French physiologist, psychologist, and founding member of the Nancy School of Hypnosis
- Hippolyte Bernheim – French physician, neurologist, and founding member of the Nancy School of Hypnosis
- Jean-Martin Charcot – French neurologist (1825–1893)
- Émile Coué – French psychologist (1857–1926)
- History of hypnosis
- Hypnotherapy – Type of complementary and alternative medicine
- Hypnotic Ego-Strengthening Procedure – Hypnotherapeutic procedure
- Hypnotic susceptibility – Measure of how easily a person can be hypnotized
- Ambroise-Auguste Liébeault – French physician and founding member of the Nancy School of Hypnosis
- Jules Liégeois – French jurist, academic, and founding member of the Nancy School of Hypnosis
- Suggestion – Psychological process of guiding a person
- The Salpêtrière School of Hypnosis – French school of psychotherapy from 1882
