= International Journal of Psychology =

- Discipline: Psychology
- Language: English
- Edited by: Abigail H. Gewirtz

Publication details
- History: 1966-present
- Publisher: Wiley-Blackwell on behalf of the International Union of Psychological Science
- Frequency: Bimonthly
- Impact factor: 3.2 (2022)

Standard abbreviations
- ISO 4: Int. J. Psychol.

Indexing
- CODEN: IJPSBB
- ISSN: 0020-7594 (print); 1464-066X (web)
- LCCN: 66009906
- OCLC no.: 71365089

Links
- Journal homepage; Online access; Online archive

The International Journal of Psychology is a bimonthly peer-reviewed academic journal covering all aspects of psychology. It was established in 1966 by Paul Fraisse. It is published by Wiley-Blackwell on behalf of the International Union of Psychological Science.

In 2025, the two editor-in-chief are Professor Peter Jonason (University of Economics and Human Sciences, Warsaw, Poland) and Professor Liqi Zhu (Shandong Normal University).

== Abstracting and indexing ==
The journal is abstracted and indexed by:

- Current Contents/Social & Behavioral Sciences
- EBSCO databases
- European Reference Index for the Humanities
- Index Medicus/MEDLINE/PubMed
- ProQuest databases
- PsycINFO
- Scopus
- Social Sciences Citation Index
- Sociological Abstracts

According to the Journal Citation Reports, the journal had a 2022 impact factor of 3.2. By the end of 2025, this figure was 1.6.
