= André Muller Weitzenhoffer =

Psychologist and hypnosis researcher

- Born: 16 January 1921; Paris, France
- Died: 24 February 2005 (aged 84); Reno, Nevada, United States
- Education: University of Michigan
- Known for: Hypnosis, Hypnotic susceptibility
- Awards: Milton H. Erickson Award for Outstanding Scientific Writing on Hypnotism (ASCH, 1974, 1980), Morton Prince Award (American Board of Psychological Hypnosis, 1986), Distinguished Contributions to Scientific Hypnosis Award (Division 30 of the APA, 1992)
- Scientific career
- Fields: Psychology, Hypnosis
- Workplaces: Stanford University, University of Oklahoma

André Muller Weitzenhoffer (16 January 1921 – 24 February 2004) was one of the most prolific researchers in the field of hypnosis in the latter half of the 20th century, having authored over 100 publications between 1949 and 2004. He was the recipient of several professional and academic awards, including the Distinguished Contributions to Scientific Hypnosis Award of the American Psychological Association in 1992.

== Career ==
Weitzenhoffer had been the author or co-author of 14 scientific publications and one book before receiving his Ph.D. in Psychology from the University of Michigan in 1956. In 1957, at the invitation of Ernest R. Hilgard he moved to the Laboratory for Human Development and Department of Psychology at Stanford University. In 1962, Weitzenhoffer moved to the University of Oklahoma where he carried out research and provided clinical services at the Veterans Administration Medical Center.

Weitzenhoffer was an important figure in the beginning of the American Society of Clinical Hypnosis and one of the first associate editors of the American Journal of Clinical Hypnosis.

=== Hypnosis ===
Weitzenhoffer claimed that he became interested in hypnosis at age 12 after seeing a demonstration by a summer camp counselor and subsequently witnessing a stage hypnosis show.

==== Weitzenhoffer & Erickson ====
Weitzenhoffer and Milton Erickson were friends and at times collaborators, with a mutual respect for each other's work. However, Weitzenhoffer was critical of certain aspects of Erickson's theory and practice, and especially critical of those who subsequently claimed to represent Erickson's views.

We were, I think, good friends even though separated by a considerable age difference, and had a mutual high respect for each other as professionals. As associate editor of the American Journal of Clinical Hypnosis for some years, I worked closely with him in its publication. I was also his consultant for a number of his published papers in the 1960s. We had differences of opinion as well as goals, but these differences never were a source of friction between us. As the years have gone by, since his death, Erickson has become an increasing living legend, as will happen with legends, an increasing amount of more or less fictitious lore began to accumulate about him.

Weitzenhoffer elaborates in detail upon various points of contention regarding Erickson's theory and practice, and the claims of others regarding his life's work, in The Practice of Hypnotism (2000), and elsewhere.

=== Stanford Hypnotic Susceptibility Scales ===
At Stanford University, Weitzenhoffer collaborated with Ernest R. Hilgard in developing the Stanford Hypnotic Susceptibility Scales and the Stanford Profile Scales of Hypnotic Susceptibility, Forms I and II which are considered the most widely referenced research tools in the field of hypnosis.

== Publications ==
Weitzenhoffer published his first paper, "The Production of Anti-Social Acts Under Hypnosis" in the Journal of Abnormal and Social Psychology for 1949, and subsequently authored over 100 journal articles, books, etc., on hypnosis. Weitzenhoffer published his first book on hypnosis, Hypnotism: An Objective Study in Suggestibility in 1953. He authored one of the most widely read scientific and clinical textbooks on hypnotherapy, The Practice of Hypnotism, a second, revised edition of which came out in 2000.
