= Hippolyte Bernheim =

French physician, neurologist, and founding member of the Nancy School of Hypnosis

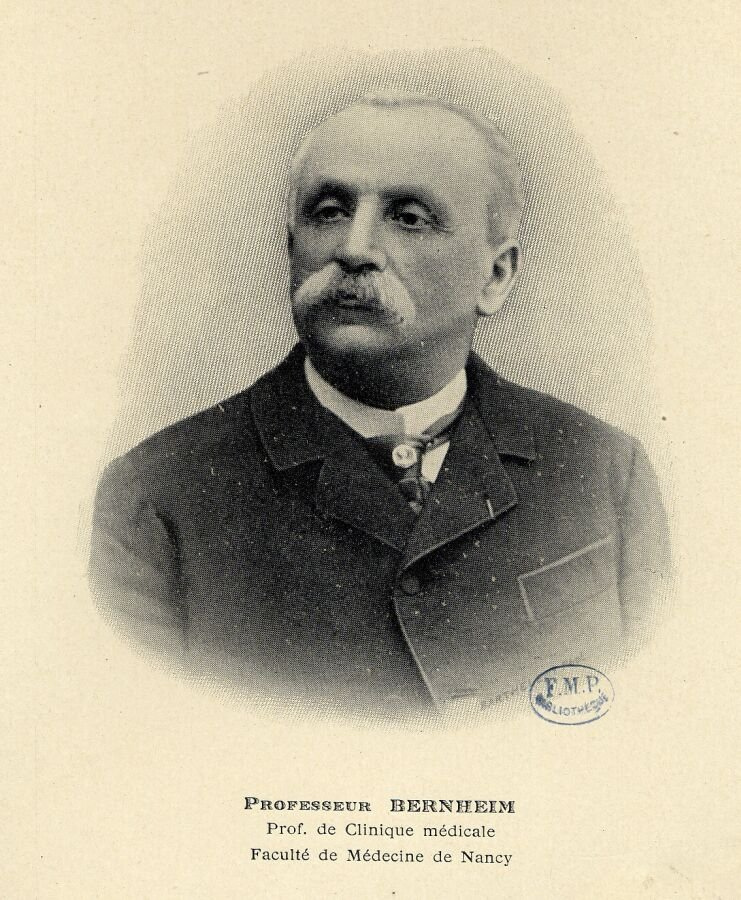
- Hippolyte Bernheim
- Born: 17 April 1840; Mulhouse, France
- Died: 2 February 1919 (aged 78); Paris, France
- Education: University of Strasbourg
- Occupations: Physician and neurologist
- Known for: Theory of suggestibility in relation to hypnotism

Hippolyte Bernheim (17 April 1840, in Mulhouse – 2 February 1919, in Paris) was a French physician and neurologist. He is chiefly known for his theory of suggestibility in relation to hypnotism.

== Life ==
Born into a Jewish family, Bernheim received his education in his native town and at the University of Strasbourg, where he was graduated as doctor of medicine in 1867. The same year he became a lecturer at the university and established himself as a physician in the city.

When, in 1871, after the Franco-Prussian War, Strasbourg passed to Germany, Bernheim moved to the French city of Nancy, where he met and later collaborated with Ambroise-Auguste Liébeault in the university of which town he became clinical professor.

== The Nancy School ==
When the medical faculty took up hypnotism, about 1880, Bernheim was very enthusiastic, and soon became one of the leaders of the investigation. He became a well-known authority in this new field of medicine.

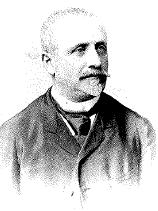
Hippolyte Bernheim.

Albert Moll (1862–1939), an active promoter of hypnotism in Germany, went to Nancy and studied with Bernheim; while in the United States Boris Sidis and Morton Prince were also considered part of the Nancy School.

Bernheim also had a significant influence on Sigmund Freud, who had visited Bernheim in 1889, and witnessed some of his experiments (though he was known as an antagonist of Jean-Martin Charcot with whom Freud had studied in Paris). Freud had already translated Bernheim's On Suggestion and its Applications to Therapy into German in 1888; and later described how "I was a spectator of Bernheim's astonishing experiments upon his hospital patients, and I received the profoundest impression of the possibility that there could be powerful mental processes which nevertheless remained hidden from the consciousness of man". He would later term himself a pupil of Bernheim, and it was out of his practice of Bernheim's suggestion/hypnosis that psychoanalysis would evolve.

Bernheim himself increasingly turned from hypnosis to the use of suggestion in a waking state. In 1886, he adopted Hack Tuke's term 'psycho-therapeutic action' and in 1891 he used the term 'psychotherapy' in the title of book as a synonym for his suggestive therapeutics.

== Acknowledged false memories ==
One of the earliest accounts of a false memory which was induced by a therapist comes from Bernheim in the 1880s. Bernheim suggested to his patient Marie that she had witnessed an old bachelor rape a young girl. After the session, Bernheim said: "it is not a dream; it is not a vision I have given you during your hypnotic sleep; it is the truth itself; and if inquiry is made into this crime later on, you will tell the truth" (Bernheim, 1889, p. 165). One of Bernheim's friends asked Marie about the event three days later, and she gave a perfect recollection of the alleged event, including the name of the rapist and his victim, as well as the date, time, and place of the crime. Bernheim then tested Marie's confidence in her testimony by asking if it was not perhaps a "vision like those [he] was in the habit of giving her during her sleep" (Bernheim, 1889, p. 165; original French in Bernheim, 1884, p. 12), but Marie remained adamant of the veracity of the story. Marie even agreed to testify at a trial, under oath.

== Criticism ==
Bernheim has been criticised for failing to recognise the role of what Pierre Janet called the rapport between hypnotizer and hypnotised - the element from which Freud would evolve the concept of transference.

== Works ==
Bernheim wrote many works, of which the following are mentioned here:

- "Des Fièvres Typhiques en Général", Strasburg, 1868.
- Leçons de Clinique Médicale, Paris, 1877.
- De la Suggestion dans l'État Hypnotique et dans l'État de Veille, Paris, 1884.
- De la Suggestion et de ses Applications à la Thérapeutique, Paris, 1886.
- Bernheim, Hippolyte (1889), "Hypnotisme et Suggestion: doctrine de la Salpêtrière et doctrine de Nancy" ('Hypnotism and Suggestion: Doctrine of the Salpêtrière and doctrine of Nancy'), Le Temps (Supplement), (29 January 1891), pp. 1-2.

English translations:

- Bernheim, H. (Herter, C.A. trans.) (1889), Suggestive Therapeutics: A Treatise on the Nature and Uses of Hypnotism (De la Suggestion et de son Application à la Thérapeutique, Deuxième édition, 1887), New York, NY: G.P. Putnam's Sons.
- Bernheim H. (Sandor R.S, trans.) (1980), Bernheim's New Studies in Hypnotism (Hypnotisme, Suggestion, Psychothérapie: Études Nouvelles, 1891), New York, NY: International University's Press.

== See also ==
- Animal magnetism – Pseudoscientific theory about force in living things
- Henri-Étienne Beaunis – French physiologist, psychologist, and founding member of the Nancy School of Hypnosis
- False memory – Psychological occurrence
- Ambroise-Auguste Liébeault – French physician and founding member of the Nancy School of Hypnosis
- Jules Liégeois – French jurist, academic, and founding member of the Nancy School of Hypnosis
- Misattribution of memory – Misidentification during memory recall
- The Nancy School of Hypnosis – French school of psychotherapy from 1866
- Royal Commission on Animal Magnetism – 1784 French scientific bodies' investigations involving systematic controlled trials
- The Salpêtrière School of Hypnosis – French school of psychotherapy from 1882
- Suggestibility – Inclination to accept the suggestions of others
- Suggestion – Psychological process of guiding a person
