= Paul Fraisse =

French psychologist (1911–1996)

- Born: 20 March 1911; Saint-Étienne
- Died: October 12, 1996 (aged 85); Paris
- Education: PhD (psychology, 1992), Grenoble II; PhD (philosophy, 2007), Université Paris VIII
- Scientific career
- Fields: Psychology
- Workplaces: University of Paris
- Academic advisors: Albert Michotte

Paul Fraisse (20 March 1911–12 October 1996) was a French psychologist known his work in the field of perception of time.

== Biography ==
Fraisse trained in theology as part of a Jesuit Novitiate to become a Jesuit priest. These plans were abandoned owing to poor health. Later, he turned to philosophy and scholastic philosophy at the Catholic University of Lyon, still hoping to prepare for the priesthood. After his degree, a faculty member suggested that he go to the Catholic University of Louvain where experimental psychology had an important place in the Institute of Philosophy. There he spent 1935–1937 as laboratory assistant to Albert Michotte, doing experiments on visual perception and preparing for examinations in philosophy. In 1937 Fraisse began to give courses in psychology at the Catholic University of Lyon but would live in Paris, where Henri Piéron, on the recommendation of Michotte, took Fraisse into his laboratory.

He was imprisoned for three years during World War II. After the war, he, Emmanuel Mounier, Paul Ricœur and Jean-Marie Domenach founded the community of the White Walls in Châtenay-Malabry.

In 1952, Fraisse took over from Henri Piéron as director of the Laboratoire de Psychologie Experimentale.

In 1965, Fraisse became the director of the Institute of Psychology of the University of Paris, which grouped together psychologists from the University of Paris, the College de France, and the Ecole Pratique des Hautes Etudes. He created new diplomas there for abnormal psychology, educational psychology, industrial psychology, and experimental psychology.

In 1966, he established the International Journal of Psychology.

== Personal life ==
Fraisse’s first wife died in 1938. He later married Simone Fraisse (1913–2004). They had four children, including the feminist philosopher Geneviève Fraisse.

== Bibliography ==
- Ecrits de captivité: 1940-1943
- Manuel pratique de psychologie expérimentale. Paris, 1956.
- Les Structures rythmiques: Etude psychologique. Louvain, 1956.
- Psychologie du temps. Paris, 1957.
- Traité de psychologie expérimentale, Paris, Presses universitaires de France, 1963, 1re éd., 9 vol. (Paul Fraisse and Jean Piaget)
