= Albert Michotte =

Belgian psychologist (1881–1965)

- Born: October 13, 1881
- Died: June 2, 1965 (aged 83)
- Scientific career
- Fields: Perception
- Institutions: Catholic University of Leuven
- Doctoral advisor: Oswald Külpe
- Doctoral students: Paul Fraisse

Albert Edouard, Baron Michotte van den Berck (13 October 1881, in Brussels, Belgium – 2 June 1965) was a Belgian experimental psychologist.

== Life ==
=== Family ===
Michotte was born to a distinguished, well-to-do, noble Catholic family. He was second and last child of Edmond Michotte and Marie Bellefroid and younger brother of geographer Paul Michotte.

Michotte married Lucie Mulle (1885–1958), who gained the title Baroness Lucie Michotte van den Berck.

=== Certification ===
He enrolled at the University of Leuven at the age of sixteen, originally studying philosophy. He obtained his license in 1899 in the study of Physiology and the psychology of sleep, and in 1900, his doctorate in philosophy with a thesis on Spencer's ethics.

=== Early work ===
His interest was drawn toward experimental research, and so enrolled in the department of natural sciences where he joined the laboratory for two years, the same which had once been used by Arthur Van Gehuchten. It was during this time that he made his first scientific contributions: two publications on the histology of the nerve cell. After having a conversation with Désiré Mercier, founder of Leuven's laboratory of experimental psychology, was when he finally decided to dedicate himself to psychology. He began working under Armand Thiéry, who had been the laboratory director since 1894. Michotte wrote a publication on his research on tactual sense in 1905 based on his first experimental work. Between 1905 and 1908, he spent one semester of each year in Germany, working first with Wilhelm Wundt at Leipzig, then at Würzburg with Oswald Külpe. During this time he was also giving a course at Leuven on experimental psychology the other half of the year. His early work, done before World War I, was focused on logical memory and voluntary choice. Much of that work was heavily influenced by Külpe, through the employment of "systematic experimental introspection".

=== Flees Belgium ===
After Leuven burned down in the beginning of World War I, Michotte fled the country, as many other Belgians of the time did. He went to the Netherlands where he stayed until 1918. There he worked with a friend at the Utrecht laboratory, studying the measurement of acoustic energy.

=== Post WWI ===
After the war he returned to Belgium and returned to his teaching post and research at Leuven. Through his involvement, the teaching and research of psychology at Leuven underwent a considerable expansion and several additional professors were appointed. Michotte organized an Institut de Psychologie in 1944, which was able to grant the degree of docteur en psychologie. Throughout these years, even during World War II, Michotte was completely devoted to his work, and had little time for other activities or interests. He would often travel to various foreign universities to present papers. He also attended every International Congress of Psychology from 1905 until the 1950s. He was elected an International Member of the American Philosophical Society in 1950. In 1952 he became professor emeritus, though continued to teach a course in perception in to 1956. He was elected to the United States National Academy of Sciences that same year.

=== Old age ===
He continued to frequent the laboratory; however, in 1962 he had a small cardiac attack, which sent him to a clinic for several months. Yet even there he continued to write and direct experiments through the help of his colleagues. Although he remained active until a few weeks before his death, he was housebound for the last three years of his life. He died in his home in 1965.

== Work ==
The main focus of Michotte's research was perception. This was the theme of his first research, and it was to this field, albeit with a new perspective, that almost all of his work after 1940 is devoted. He also had a reputation for creating new and creative techniques and instruments. His 1946 book, The Perception of Causality, published in French, became the pioneer work in event perception and met with international acclaim. In this book, he shows how certain very simple visual sequences carry the appearance of causal connectedness. Michotte emphasizes that this appearance is perceptual, not inferred by association: "[T]his is not just a "meaning" attributed to the literal, step-by-step translation of a table of stimuli; they are primitive specific impressions which arise in the perceptual field itself," he writes. Though Michotte is often criticized for too-strong conclusions, his work on the perception of causality is generally regarded as path-breaking and correct, at least at its core. However, he did not see the study of perception of causality as a simple isolated problem. Instead he thought of it as he did most of his research, as only one aspect of a broader field of study. Indeed as he says in his autobiography he did not see his work as a simple "hunt for facts", but rather as part of a larger problem. Wagemans et al. (2006) give an account of Michotte's work.
