= Master of Psychology =

Academic degree

The Master of Psychology (often abbreviated Psy.M. or M.Psych.) is a master's degree in the field of Psychology.

== Australia ==
In Australia, the MPsych title is usually associated with a specialization, such as MPsych (Clinical) or MPsych (Counselling).

== France ==
In France, the PsyM is a professional and/or a research master's degree and is offered through a number of different universities. The PsyM is considered a specialization in one of the different fields of psychology (neuropsychology, psychopathology, occupational psychology, ...).

A professional PsyM is required to access the title of psychologist, and practice as such in clinical settings.

All students entering a professional PsyM program are required to have a recognized bachelor's degree in a related field. The PsyM is a two years long diploma, conferring at its term a 5-years university diploma.

== Germany ==
In Germany, the completion of a 5-years higher-education degree course in psychology is required to use "psychologist" as a professional title, equivalent to the German "Diplom" or "masters" qualification in psychology.

== India ==
In India there are many types of Master's programs in psychology. They can be simply psychology, applied psychology, clinical psychology, counseling psychology, and industrial psychology. All these programs differ in content and help people work in various sector. Few government and private universities offering masters in psychology without undergraduate degree in psychology. In India, only with an M.Phil. in Clinical Psychology, Professional diploma in clinical psychology and PsyD a person is legally recognized to practice as clinical Psychologist. Even if there are counseling and other programs that cover mental health services exist in India, they are not offered access or training through M.Phil. in Clinical Psychology. This is one of the arts and science programs that lacks flexibility and monetizes on its special status in India.

== See also ==
- Bachelor of Psychology
- Doctor of Psychology
- History of psychology
- Psychologist
