= Ambroise-Auguste Liébeault =

French physician and founding member of the Nancy School of Hypnosis

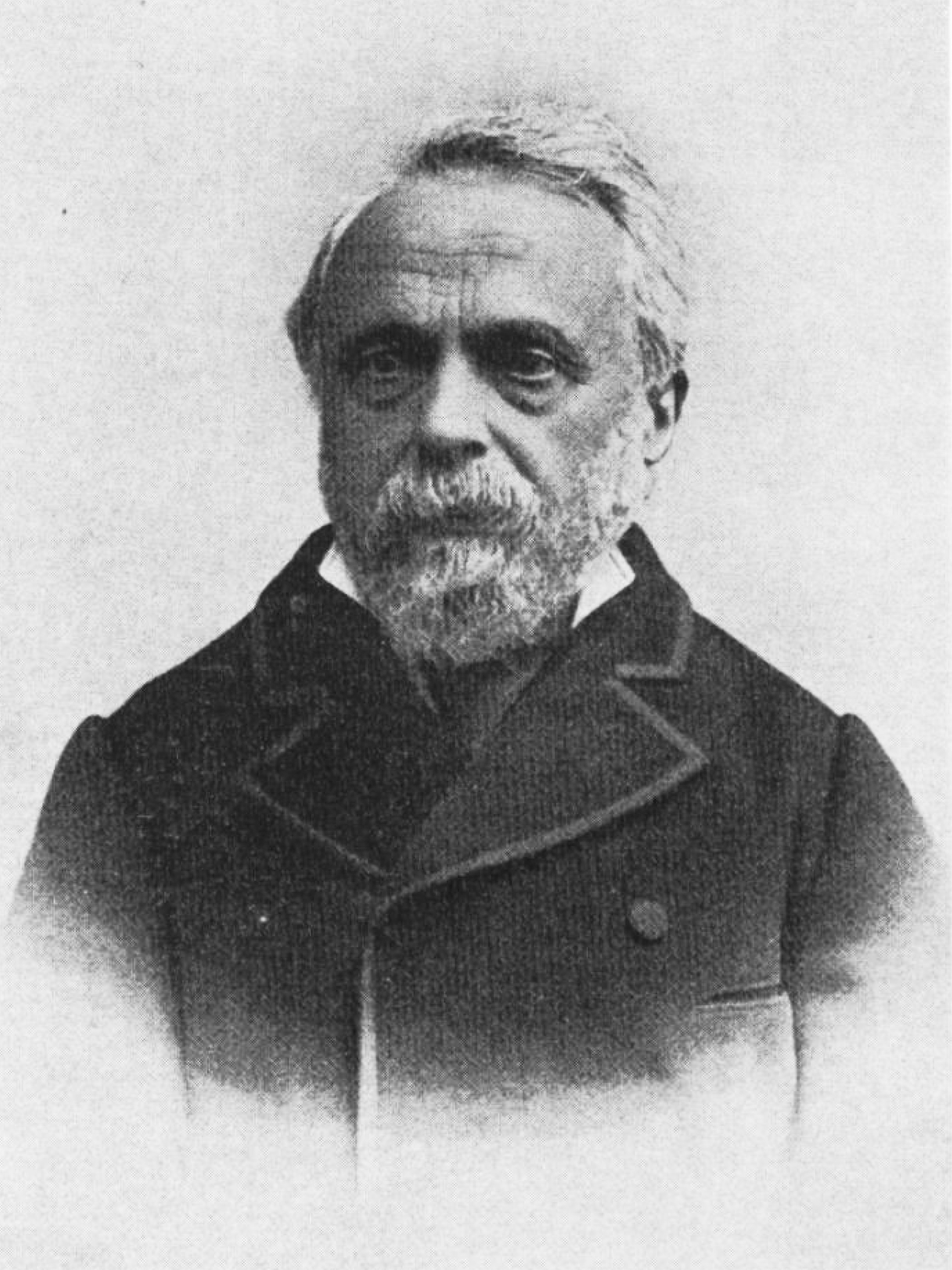
- Ambroise-Auguste Liébeault
- Born: September 16, 1823; Favières, France
- Died: 1904 (aged 80–81)
- Known for: Hypnotherapy

Ambroise-Auguste Liébeault (French pronunciation: [ɑ̃bʁwaz oɡyst ljebo]; 1823–1904) was a French physician and is considered the father of modern hypnotherapy. Ambroise-Auguste Liébeault was born in Favières, a small town in the Lorraine region of France, on September 16, 1823. He completed his medical degree at the University of Strasbourg in 1850, at the age of 26.

He established a medical practice in the village of Pont-Saint-Vincent, near the town of Nancy.

He made many advancements for the field of hypnosis and hypnotherapy, such as co-founding the Nancy School of Hypnosis. The Nancy School — also known as the "Suggestion School", in contrast to the "Hysteria School", also known as the "Paris School", centred on the Salpêtrière Hospital — was oriented to a suggestion-centred approach to hypnosis in contrast to the previously used hysteria-centred approach promoted at the Salpêtrière Hospital. By contrast to the "Paris School", the main, fundamental belief of the "Nancy School" was that hypnosis was a normal phenomenon and not a consequence of a pathology analogous to hysteria.

Liébeault published several books on his theories, techniques, and results in working with hypnosis. On February 18, 1904, he died in Nancy, leaving behind a strong legacy and influence on the still developing field of hypnosis and hypnotherapy.

== Early life ==
Liébeault was born in Favières in Meurthe-et-Moselle, France on September 16, 1823. His father was Jean Nicolas Liébeault, a financially stable land owner and farmer, and his mother was Jeanne Fauconnier. He was the youngest sibling in his family, with five older brothers, and was the only one to pursue higher education. His family could afford to send him to seminary school, and later medical school. Liébeault's father died when he was ten years old and later attended seminary school in his honor. In 1844, at the age of 21, Ambroise chose to leave seminary school and study medicine at Strasbourg.

== Career ==
Liébeault, while studying medicine at Strasbourg, read a book on animal magnetism and was immediately interested. He decided to incorporate the techniques he had read about into his own medical practice. In the town of Nancy he established a practice where he could use his medical degree. He decided to experiment with some of the techniques that had interested him. He began by trying to see whether or not he could successfully hypnotize willing patients to alleviate their varying ailments. He offered to treat patients with hypnosis free of charge, or by standard methods for the normal consultation fee. It was unpopular to begin with but as he soon succeeded in it and became more expert in treating illnesses with hypnotherapy, the latter eventually became quite popular among the locals. In the following years he developed a unique and unorthodox approach to hypnotherapy which led to getting attention from other professionals interested in the topic.

In 1866, Liébeault published Du Sommeil et des états analogues, in which he discussed his techniques, experiments, and findings. It was poorly written and did not sell well. However he discussed his methods in which he would have each patient stare deeply into his (Liébeault's) eyes while he repeatedly gave them the instruction to sleep. Once the patients were induced into a light sleep-like state, he would assert that whatever symptoms the patient was currently debilitated by would soon disappear completely. As his success showed, many times the symptoms would disappear. Word began to spread of his medically healing ability and soon he chose to abandon his orthodox way of treating patients and began to treat them solely with hypnotherapy, all the while documenting any successes or failures along the way.

Eventually word reached Hippolyte Bernheim, a fellow medical student from Strasbourg. Bernheim had been struggling with a case of sciatica that had failed to be healed with previous, orthodox medical treatments. Bernheim heard of the many successes Liébeault had with hypnotherapy and decided to visit him. He was impressed with what he saw and began a hypnotherapy practice of his own. In collaboration, Liébeault and Bernheim co-founded the Nancy school of Hypnotism. The school's fundamental theory was that the hypnotic suggestibility was a trait that is closely related to a characteristic of general suggestibility. In other words, people's ease in becoming hypnotized will vary depending on how much of the hypnotizable trait one possessed. The second belief of the school was that the hypnotic state was normal for the human body to enter.

== Major contributions and publications ==
Liébeault's major contribution was co-founding the Nancy School of hypnosis along with Hippolyte Bernheim, Jules Liégeois, and Henri-Étienne Beaunis. Before his ideas on hypnosis became more well known he had opened his own " polyclinic" in 1860 and offered free hypnotherapy treatment. His first attempt at making his ideas known was the publishing of his first book on hypnosis, Du sommeil et des états analogues (1866). This did not gain much popularity at the time in France. He published his second book Ébauche de psycologie(1873) which was also not popular.

== Death and legacy ==
Ambroise-Auguste Liébeault died in 1904 at the age of 80. Liébeault made many contributions to the study of hypnosis. He showed that hypnosis could be used to treat physical illness. He was viewed as a fool by many of his colleagues for using hypnosis as a treatment for patients, but this changed in 1882 when he was able to treat and also cure a severe case of sciatica. When Liébeault's published work was introduced to Bernheim by Dr. Dumont (trained by Liébeault) his published books gained interest among other scholars worldwide such as Freud, and even Pavlov.

== See also ==
- Animal magnetism – Pseudoscientific theory about force in living things
- Henri-Étienne Beaunis – French physiologist, psychologist, and founding member of the Nancy School of Hypnosis
- Hippolyte Bernheim – French physician, neurologist, and founding member of the Nancy School of Hypnosis
- Émile Coué – French psychologist (1857–1926)
- Jules Liégeois – French jurist, academic, and founding member of the Nancy School of Hypnosis
- Nancy School of Hypnosis – French school of psychotherapy from 1866
- Royal Commission on Animal Magnetism – 1784 French scientific bodies' investigations involving systematic controlled trials
- The Salpêtrière School of Hypnosis – French school of psychotherapy from 1882
- Suggestibility – Inclination to accept the suggestions of others
- Suggestion – Psychological process of guiding a person
