= Pneumotherapy =

Medical use of compressed or rarefied gases

Pneumotherapy is the medical use of compressed or rarefied gases, and was at one time used to treat people suffering from pneumothorax (lung collapse).
