= Suggestion =

Psychological process of guiding a person

Suggestion is the psychological process by which a person guides their own or another person's desired thoughts, feelings, and behaviors by presenting stimuli that may elicit them as reflexes instead of relying on conscious effort.

Nineteenth-century writers on psychology such as William James used the words "suggest" and "suggestion" in the context of a particular idea which was said to suggest another when it brought that other idea to mind. Early scientific studies of hypnosis by Clark Leonard Hull and others extended the meaning of these words in a special and technical sense (Hull, 1933).

The original neuropsychological theory of hypnotic suggestion was based upon the ideomotor reflex response that William B. Carpenter declared, in 1852, was the principle through which James Braid's hypnotic phenomena were produced.

== Émile Coué ==
Émile Coué (1857–1926) was a significant pioneer in the development of an understanding of the application of therapeutic suggestion; and, according to Cheek and LeCron, most of our current knowledge of suggestion "stems from Coué" (1968, p. 60). With the intention of "saturating the cognitive microenvironment of the mind", Coué's therapeutic method approach was based on four non-controversial principles:

1. suggestion can produce somatic phenomena;
2. specific suggestions generate specific somatic outcomes;
3. suggestions are just as efficacious in the treatment of physical or organic conditions as they are for functional or emotional conditions; and
4. a successful suggestion-based intervention for a physical condition does not indicate that the original complaint was in any way imaginary.

== Charles Baudouin ==
Charles Baudouin's "laws of suggestion" are:

The Law of Concentrated Attention
If spontaneous attention is concentrated on an idea, this tends to become realized.
The Law of Auxiliary Emotion, also called the Law of dominant effect
When a suggestion is supported by emotion it will become stronger than every other suggestion, given at the same moment.
The Law of Reversed Effort
If conscious will is in conflict with the imagination, the imagination will win.
The Law of Subconscious Teleology
When the goal has been traced out the unconscious will find out how to reach it. To be realized an idea must be unconsciously processed and accepted. The mechanism is the same as in motivation.

== Hypnosis ==
=== Trance and suggestion ===
Modern scientific study of hypnosis, which follows the pattern of Hull's work, separates two essential factors: "trance" and suggestion. The state of mind induced by "trance" is said to come about via the process of a hypnotic induction—essentially instructing and suggesting to the subject that they will enter a hypnotic state. Once a subject enters hypnosis, the hypnotist gives suggestions that can produce sought effects. Commonly used suggestions on measures of "suggestibility" or "susceptibility" (or for those with a different theoretical orientation, "hypnotic talent") include suggestions that one's arm is getting lighter and floating up in the air, or that a fly is buzzing around one's head. The "classic" response to an accepted suggestion that one's arm is beginning to float in the air is that the subject perceives the intended effect as happening involuntarily.

=== Scientific hypnotism ===
Consistent with the views of Pierre Janet—who noted (1920, pp.284–285) that the critical feature is not the making of a 'suggestion', but, instead, is the taking of the 'suggestion'—Weitzenhoffer (2000, passim), argued that scientific hypnotism centres on the delivery of "suggestions" to hypnotized subjects; and, according to Yeates (2016b, p.35), these suggestions are delivered with the intention of eliciting:

1. the further stimulation of partially active mental states and/or physiological processes;
2. the awakening of dormant mental states and/or physiological processes;
3. the activation of latent mental states and/or physiological processes;
4. alterations in existing perceptions, thoughts, feelings, and/or behaviours; and/or
5. entirely new perceptions, thoughts, feelings, and/or behaviours.

=== Temporal dimensions ===
Furthermore, according to Yeates (2016b, pp.35–36), 'suggestions' have four temporal dimensions:

1. pre-hypnotic suggestions, delivered prior to the formal induction;
2. suggestions for within-hypnotic influence, to elicit specific within-session outcomes;
3. suggestions for post-hypnotic influence, to elicit specific post-session outcomes:
  1. immediate influence ("and, on leaving here today, you'll…");
  2. shorter-term influence ("and, each time you're…");
  3. longer-term influence ("and, as time passes, you'll increasingly…"); or
  4. specific-moment influence (Bernheim's suggestions à longue échéance, 'suggestions to be realised after a long interval'), which are (i) intended "to produce a particular effect at a designated later hour", (ii) have "no influence before the appointed hour", (iii) nor "after it had expired" (Barrows, 1896, pp.22–23), or
4. post-hypnotic suggestions, delivered to dehypnotised-but-not-yet-completely-reoriented subjects.

== Waking suggestion ==
Suggestions, however, can also have an effect in the absence of a hypnosis. These so-called "waking suggestions" are given in precisely the same way as "hypnotic suggestions" (i.e., suggestions given within hypnosis) and can produce strong changes in perceptual experience. Experiments on suggestion, in the absence of hypnosis, were conducted by early researchers such as Hull (1933). More recently, researchers such as Nicholas Spanos and Irving Kirsch have conducted experiments investigating such non-hypnotic-suggestibility and found a strong correlation between people's responses to suggestion both in- and outside hypnosis.

== Other forms ==
In addition to the kinds of suggestion typically delivered by researchers interested in hypnosis there are other forms of suggestibility, though not all are considered interrelated. These include: primary and secondary suggestibility (older terms for non-hypnotic and hypnotic suggestibility respectively), hypnotic suggestibility (i.e., the response to suggestion measured within hypnosis), and interrogative suggestibility (yielding to interrogative questions, and shifting responses when interrogative pressure is applied: see Gudjonsson Suggestibility Scale. Metaphors and imagery can also be used to deliver suggestion.

== See also ==
- Affirmations (New Age) – Practice of positive thinking and self-empowerment
- Attitude – Concept in psychology and communication studies
- Autosuggestion – Psychological technique related to the placebo effect
- Autogenic training – Relaxation technique
- Brainwashing – Methods that purportedly control a person's will, desire, or knowledge
- Crowd manipulation – Branch of social psychology
- Echopraxia – Involuntary imitation of another person's actions
- Experiment Perilous (1944 film) – 1944 film by Jacques Tourneur
- Gaslight (1944 film) – 1944 American film by George Cukor
- Gaslighting – Type of psychological manipulation
- Hypnotic Ego-Strengthening Procedure – Hypnotherapeutic procedure
- Hypnotic susceptibility – Measure of how easily a person can be hypnotized
- Ideomotor phenomenon – Concept in hypnosis and psychological research
- Introjection – Psychological process
- Neuro-linguistic programming – Pseudoscientific approach to psychotherapy
- Posthypnotic amnesia – Inability in hypnotic subjects to recall events that took place while under hypnosis
- Psychosomatic medicine – Interdisciplinary medical field exploring various influences on bodily processes
- The Nancy School of Hypnosis – French school of psychotherapy from 1866
- The Salpêtrière School of Hypnosis – French school of psychotherapy from 1882
- Self-hypnosis – Form, process, or result of a self-induced hypnotic state
- Subconscious – Part of the mind that is not currently of focal awareness
- Suggestibility – Inclination to accept the suggestions of others
