= Henri Piéron =

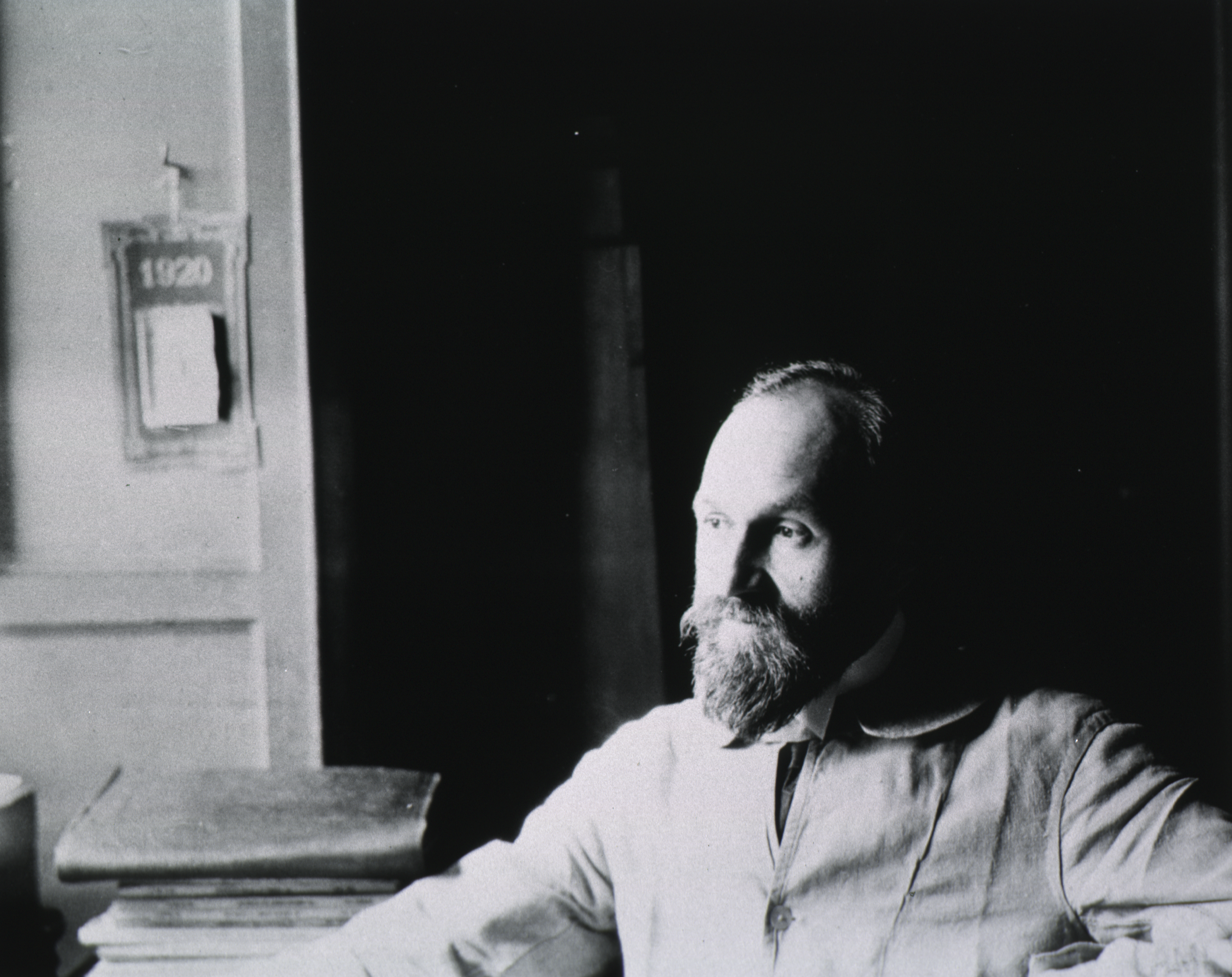
- Born: Louis Charles Henri Piéron; July 18, 1881; Paris, France
- Died: November 6, 1964 (aged 83); Suresnes, France
- Scientific career
- Fields: Psychology

Louis Charles Henri Piéron (French: [lwi ʃaʁl ɑ̃ʁi pjeʁɔ̃]; 18 July 1881 – 6 November 1964) was a French psychologist. He was one of the founders of scientific psychology in France. He developed the Toulouse-Piéron Cancellation Test (TP) with Édouard Toulouse.

== Biography ==
Henri Piéron was Professor of Physiology of Sensation at the Collège de France from 1923 to 1951. He took part in the first Davos University Course (a project to start an international university based in Davos) in 1928, along with many other prominent academics such as Albert Einstein and Hans Driesch. The same year, he created the Institut national d'orientation professionnelle (INOP), which became the Institut national d'étude du travail et d'orientation professionnelle (Inetop) in 1942, and is now supported by the Conservatoire National des Arts et Métiers. After founding the first institute for "careers", he took charge of training guidance counsellors and conducted research into the field of counselling psychology. He became president of the Société zoologique de France in 1946.

== Sources ==
- Piaget, Jean (March 1966). "Henri Piéron: 1881-1964". The American Journal of Psychology. 79 (1): 2, 147–150.
- Reuchlin, Maurice (1964). "Henri Piéron 18 juillet 1881 – 6 novembre 1964". Revue de Psychologie Appliquée. 14 (4): 213–218.
- Parot, Françoise (1989). "Les archives d'Henri Piéron". La Gazette des archives, revue trimestrielle de l'Association des archivistes français. 145: 136–144.
