= Covert hypnosis =

Pseudo-scientific intellectual framework

Covert hypnosis is an attempt to communicate with another person's unconscious mind without informing the subject that they will be hypnotized. It is also known as conversational hypnosis or sleight of mouth. (although both Conversational Hypnosis and Slight of Mouth can also be done overtly). It is a term largely used by proponents of neuro-linguistic programming (NLP), a pseudoscientific approach to communication and interaction.

The objective is to change the person's behavior subconsciously so that the target believes that they changed their mind of their own volition. When or if performed successfully, the target is unaware that they were hypnotized or that anything unusual has occurred. Arguably there is a debate about what hypnosis is, and how covert hypnosis should be classified. "Standard" hypnosis requires the focus and attention of the subject, while covert hypnosis seems to focus on "softening" the subject by using confusion, fatigue, directed attention, and interrupted sentences. This is most similar to salesmen talking to customers when they are tired. Critical thinking and questioning of statements likely requires mental effort. The theme of "covert hypnosis" appears to be along the lines of causing the subject to enter "down time". Regardless of whether "covert hypnosis" fits the standard definition of hypnosis, fatigue appears to impair critical thinking. This might explain why interrogation, military training, and cult-recruitment practices prefer to deprive their new recruits of sleep.

== Technique ==
Covert hypnosis is a phenomenon similar to indirect hypnosis, as derived from Milton H. Erickson and popularized as "The Milton Model" in style, but the defining feature is that the hypnotized individual subsequently engages in hypnotic phenomena without conscious effort or choice. Covert hypnosis, like "Ericksonian Hypnosis", "operates through covert and subtle means... to reach deeper levels of consciousness than are touched by the surface structure of language". It is the concept that an individual, 'the hypnotist,' can control another individual's behavior via gaining rapport. During hypnosis, the operator or hypnotist makes suggestions. The subject is intended to not be completely aware, on a conscious level, of the suggestions.

The hypnotist gains rapport with the listener(s) and the hypnotist maintains psychological congruency (the act of truly acting towards your goals without hesitation), both linguistically and in one's nonverbal communication. As the subject listens while feeling a psychological connection with the hypnotist and the hypnotist displaying behaviors such as confidence and understanding, the hypnotist then presents linguistic data in the form of metaphor:

The Metaphor presents a surface structure of meaning in the actual words of the story, which activates an associated deep structure of meaning that is indirectly relevant to the listener, which activates a recovered deep structure of meaning that is directly relevant to the listener.

In other words, this process builds most likely unconscious states within the listener, and then associates those states through covert conditioning, also known as covert anchoring, thereby forming unconsciously controlled behaviors and thoughts. Often methods of tricking the listener to believe that the hypnotist is talking about something else other than the subject are employed, for instance, by shifting use of time and use of identity in language. One famous example is employed by Milton H. Erickson "and a tomato can be happy.".

=== An example ===
A state of forgetfulness may be elicited by talking about what it feels like to be in that state in a manner that implies the other person is currently experiencing it. Once this state is at a heightened peak the hypnotist can then talk about that state, relating to a concept like the unsuspecting subject's name (a phenomenon called name amnesia), and the subject will suddenly be unaware of his/her name on questioning (provided the suggestions implied immediate effect and the subject is suggestible enough to be influenced in this way). The purpose of covert hypnosis is to shut down or at least reduce the analytical part of the subject's mind, lest they suspect something. This may be achieved fairly quickly by someone with practice.

== In the media ==
Real estate trainer Glenn Twiddle in June 2010, appeared on the Australian television show A Current Affair. The segment explains how he teaches real-estate agents these techniques to use on unsuspecting buyers of property.

== In fiction ==
In fiction "covert hypnosis" has been featured in television series, though rather overrepresented. In The Mentalist, covert hypnosis is portrayed in an episode when a perpetrator uses it to control others and attempts to kill her employer. In an episode of The X-Files, a man with a brain tumor gains additional skill in hypnosis, and he utilizes it to escape police captivity.

== See also ==
- Highway hypnosis
- History of hypnosis
- Hypnagogia
- Hypnosis
- Hypnosis in popular culture
- Hypnotherapy

== Books ==
- Kevin Hogan (2006). Covert Hypnosis: An Operator's Manual. Network 3000 Publishing. p. 232. ISBN 978-0-9709321-4-3.
- Kevin Hogan and James Speakman (2006). Covert Persuasion: Psychological Tactics and Tricks to Win the Game. Wiley. p. 223. ISBN 978-0-470-05141-2.
- Glenn Twiddle (2010). Advanced Hypnotic Selling. Glenn Twiddle Publishing. p. 136. ISBN 978-0-9807711-0-7.
- Steven Peliari (2009). The Art Of Covert Hypnosis.
