= Hobby Lobby (disambiguation) =

Hobby Lobby is a chain of arts and crafts stores in the United States.

Hobby Lobby may also refer to:

- Burwell v. Hobby Lobby Stores, Inc. a 2014 United States Supreme Court case involving the above chain
- Hobby Express, an unrelated retailer of remote-controlled toys previously called Hobby Lobby International
- Hobby Lobby (radio show), 1937-1949
- Charley Weaver's Hobby Lobby, a 1959-1960 television series
