= Oriental hypnosis =

Indian healing method

Oriental Hypnosis is an old Indian method of healing practiced by Sadhus, Fakirs, Yogis and sannyasis (Sannyasa). These people indulge in self-induced hypnosis or trance-states by practicing rhythmic breathing exercise method like pranayama and meditation etc.

For hetero hypnosis they used threatening stare and suggestive techniques like loud command “sleep” etc. to bring out the subjects imagination generated from within the mind.

== In the west ==
In the early 19th century Abbe Faria, Indo-Portuguese priest, and a contemporary of Mesmer introduced oriental hypnosis to Paris. Later Dr. James Esdaile learned some trance techniques from Bengali Hindu fakirs and developed it as mesmeric anesthesia. Famous historian Will Durant writes in his book “The Story of civilizations”:

“Hypnotism as therapy seems to have originated among Indians, who often took their sick to the temples to be cured by hypnotic suggestion. The Englishmen who introduced hypnotherapy into England — Braid, Esdaile, and Elliotson — "undoubtedly got their ideas, and some of their experience, from contact with India." (p.531 of 1937-edition.)

== See also ==
- History of hypnosis
