= History of hypnosis =

The development of concepts, beliefs and practices related to hypnosis and hypnotherapy stretches back hundreds of years.

Although often viewed as one continuous history, the term hypnosis was coined in the 1880s in France, some twenty years after the death of James Braid, who had adopted the term hypnotism (in 1841) — which specifically applied to the state of the subject, rather than techniques applied by the operator — to contrast his own, unique, subject-centred, approach with those of the operator-centred mesmerists/animal magnetists who preceded him.

== Historical definitions ==
De Cuvillers coined the terms "hypnotism" and "hypnosis" as an abbreviation for "neuro-hypnotism", or nervous sleep. Braid popularised the terms and gave the earliest definition of hypnosis. He contrasted the hypnotic state with normal sleep, and defined it as "a peculiar condition of the nervous system, induced by a fixed and abstracted attention of the mental and visual eye, on one object, not of an exciting nature."

Braid elaborated upon this brief definition in a later work, Hypnotic Therapeutics:

The real origin and essence of the hypnotic condition, is the induction of a habit of abstraction or mental concentration, in which, as in reverie or spontaneous abstraction, the powers of the mind are so much engrossed with a single idea or train of thought, as, for the nonce, to render the individual unconscious of, or indifferently conscious to, all other ideas, impressions, or trains of thought. The hypnotic sleep, therefore, is the very antithesis or opposite mental and physical condition to that which precedes and accompanies common sleep

Therefore, Braid defined hypnotism as a state of mental concentration that often leads to a form of progressive relaxation. Later, in his The Physiology of Fascination (1855), Braid conceded that his original terminology was misleading and argued that the term "hypnotism" or "nervous sleep" should be reserved for the minority (10%) of subjects who exhibit amnesia, substituting the term "monoideism", meaning concentration upon a single idea, as a description for the more alert state experienced by the others.

== Pre-19th century ==
=== Predecessors to Mesmer ===
Avicenna (Ibn Sina) (980–1037), a Persian psychologist and physician, was the earliest to make a distinction between sleep and hypnosis. In The Book of Healing, which he published in 1027, he referred to hypnosis in Arabic as al-Wahm al-Amil, stating that one could create conditions in another person so that he/she accepts the reality of hypnosis.

In Western cultures, hypnotism evolved out of a sometimes skeptical reaction to the much earlier work of magnetists and Mesmerists.

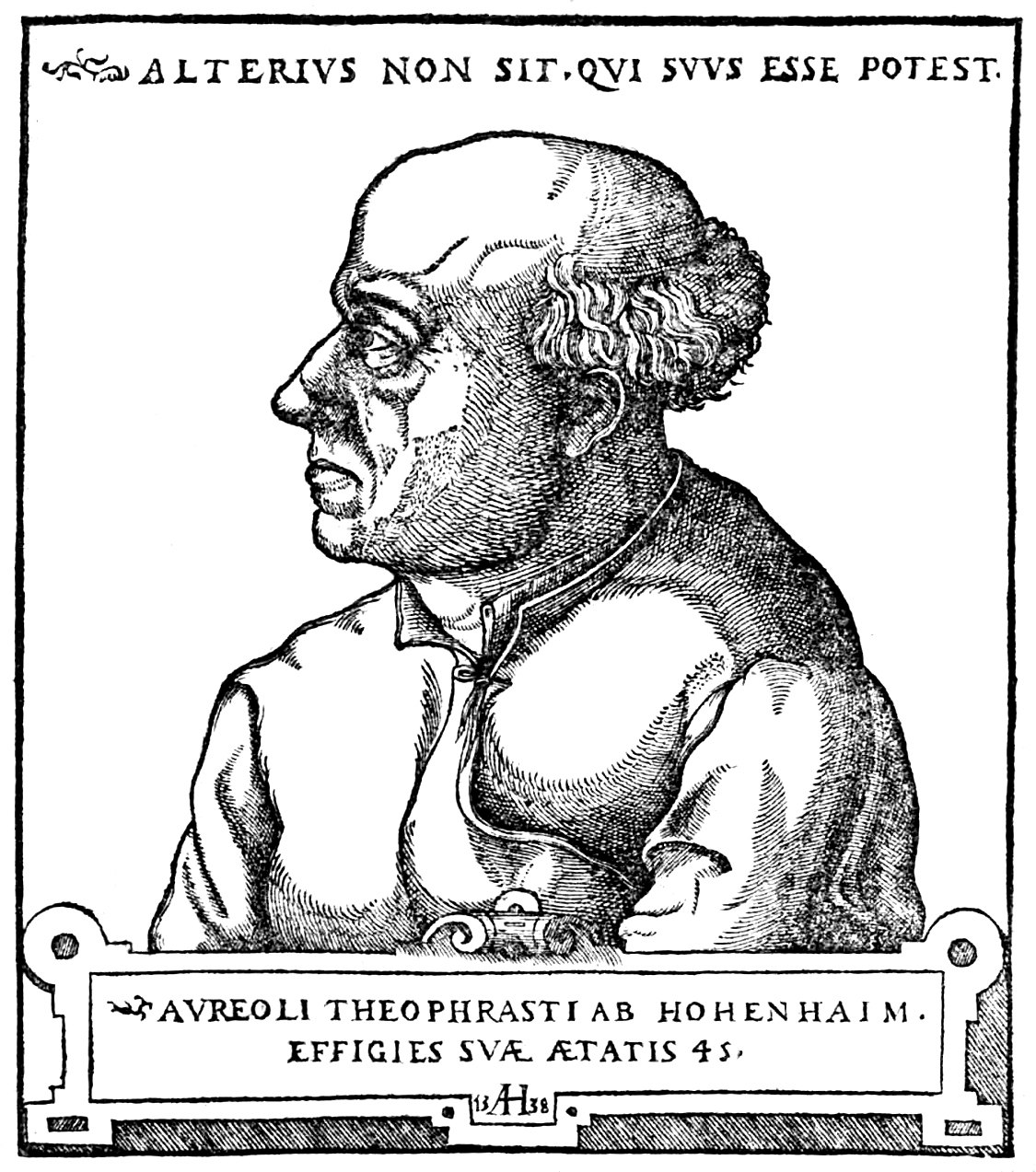
Paracelsus

Paracelsus (1493–1541), a Swiss, was the first physician to use magnets in his work. Many people claimed to have been healed after he had passed magnets (lodestones) over their bodies. An Irishman by the name of Valentine Greatrakes (1628–1682) was known as "the Great Irish Stroker" for his ability to heal people by laying his hands on them and passing magnets over their bodies. Johann Joseph Gassner (1727–1779), a Catholic priest of the time, believed that disease was caused by evil spirits and could be exorcised by incantations and prayer. Around 1771, a Viennese Jesuit named Maximilian Hell (1720–1792) was using magnets to heal by applying steel plates to the naked body. One of Father Hell's students was a young medical doctor from Vienna named Franz Anton Mesmer.

=== Franz Anton Mesmer ===
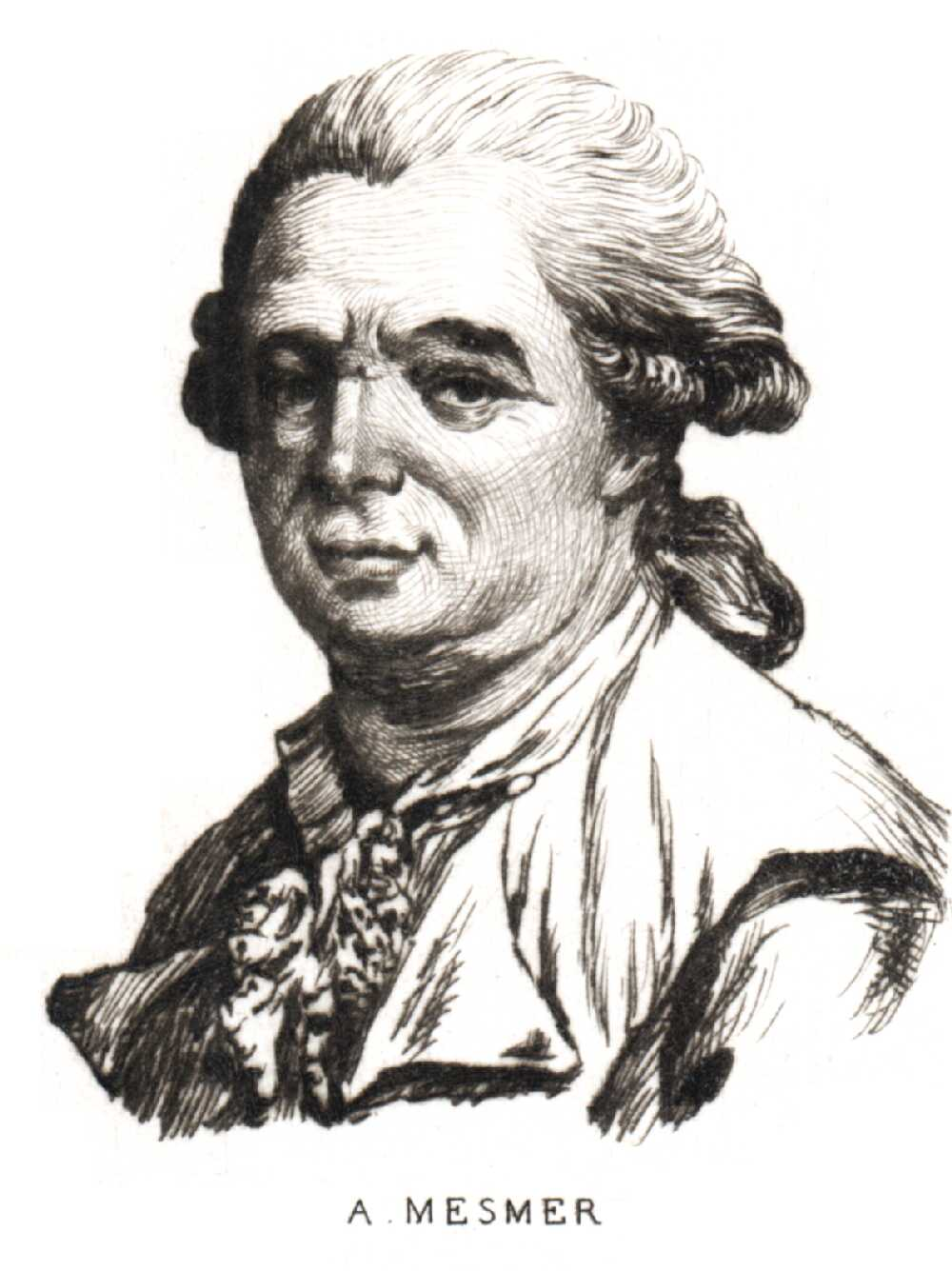
Mesmer

Western scientists first became involved in hypnosis around 1770, when Franz Mesmer (1734–1815), a physician from Austria, started investigating an effect he called "animal magnetism" or "mesmerism" (the latter name still remaining popular today).

The use of the (conventional) English term animal magnetism to translate Mesmer's magnétisme animal can be misleading and needs to be seen in this context:

- Mesmer chose his term to clearly distinguish his variant of magnetic force from those referred to at the time as mineral magnetism, cosmic magnetism and planetary magnetism.
- Mesmer felt that this particular force/power only resided in the bodies of animals, including humans.

Mesmer developed his own theory and was himself inspired by the writings of the English physician Richard Mead, the father of our understanding of transmissible diseases. Mesmer found that, after opening a patient's vein and letting the patient bleed for a while, passing magnets over the wound appeared to be an active force making the bleeding stop. Mesmer additionally discovered that using a stick instead also "worked".

After moving to Paris and becoming popular with the French aristocracy for his magnetic cures, the medical community challenged him. The French king put together a Board of Inquiry that included chemist Lavoisier, Benjamin Franklin, and a medical doctor who was an expert in pain control named Joseph Ignace Guillotin. Mesmer refused to cooperate with the investigation and this fell to his disciple Dr d'Eslon. Franklin constructed an experiment in which a blindfolded patient was shown to respond as much to a non-prepared tree as to one that had been "magnetised" by d'Eslon. This is considered perhaps the first placebo-controlled trial of a therapy ever conducted. The commission later declared that Mesmerism worked by the action of the imagination.

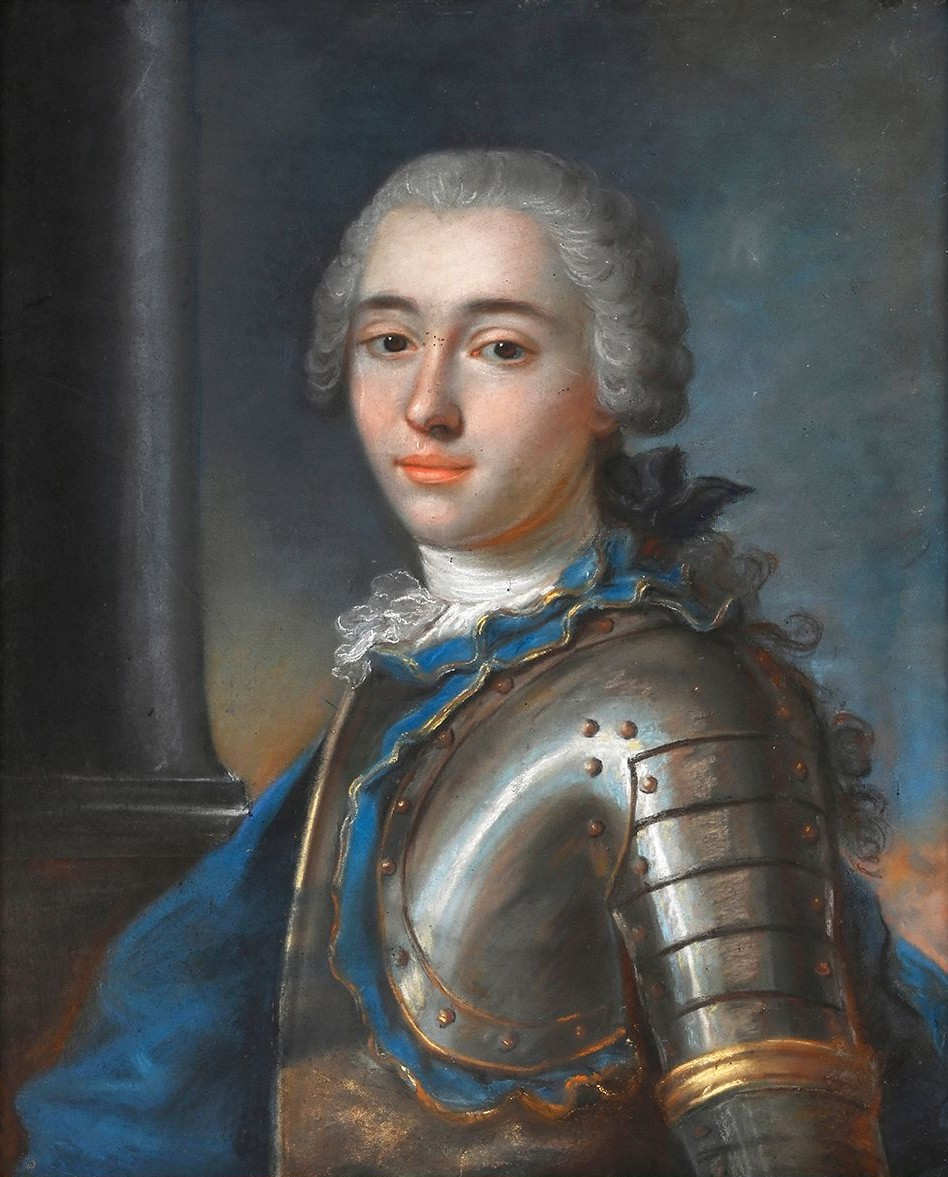
De Puységur

Although Mesmerism remained popular and "magnetic therapies" are still advertised as a form of "alternative medicine" even today, Mesmer himself retired to Switzerland in obscurity, where he died in 1815. A student of Mesmer, Marquis de Puységur, first described and coined the term for "somnambulism". Followers of Puységur called themselves "Experimentalists" and believed in the Paracelsus-Mesmer fluidism theory.

=== Abbé Faria ===
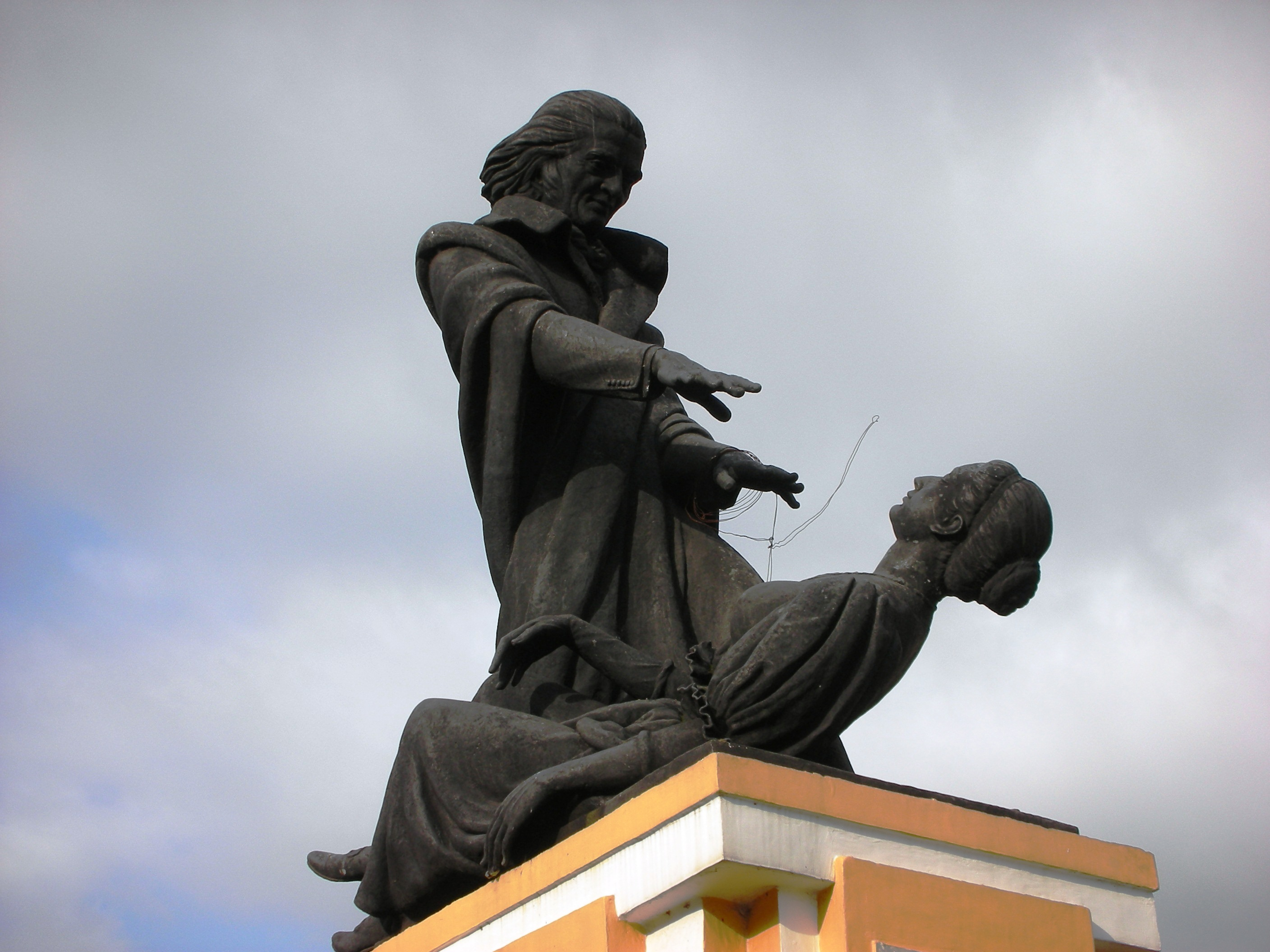
Abbé Faria

Abbé Faria was the father of Modern Hypnotism. Many of the original mesmerists were signatories to the first declarations that proclaimed the French revolution in 1789. Far from surprising, this could perhaps be expected, in that mesmerism opened up the prospect that the social order was in some sense suggested and could be overturned. Magnetism was neglected or forgotten during the Revolution and the Empire.

An Indo-Portuguese priest, Abbé Faria, revived public attention to animal magnetism. In the early 19th century, Abbé Faria introduced oriental hypnosis to Paris. Faria came from India and gave exhibitions in 1814 and 1815 without manipulations or the use of Mesmer's baquet (medical)]].

Unlike Mesmer, Faria claimed that hypnosis 'generated from within the mind' by the power of expectancy and cooperation of the patient. Faria's approach was significantly extended by the clinical and theoretical work of Hippolyte Bernheim and Ambroise-Auguste Liébeault of the Nancy School. Faria's theoretical position, and the subsequent experiences of those in the Nancy School, made significant contributions to the later autosuggestion techniques of Émile Coué and the autogenic training techniques of Johannes Heinrich Schultz.

== 19th century hypnotism ==
The 19th century saw increasing interest from the medical establishment in applications of hypnosis. Récamier, in 1821, prior to the development of hypnotism, was the first physician known to have used something resembling hypnoanesthesia and operated on patients under mesmeric coma.

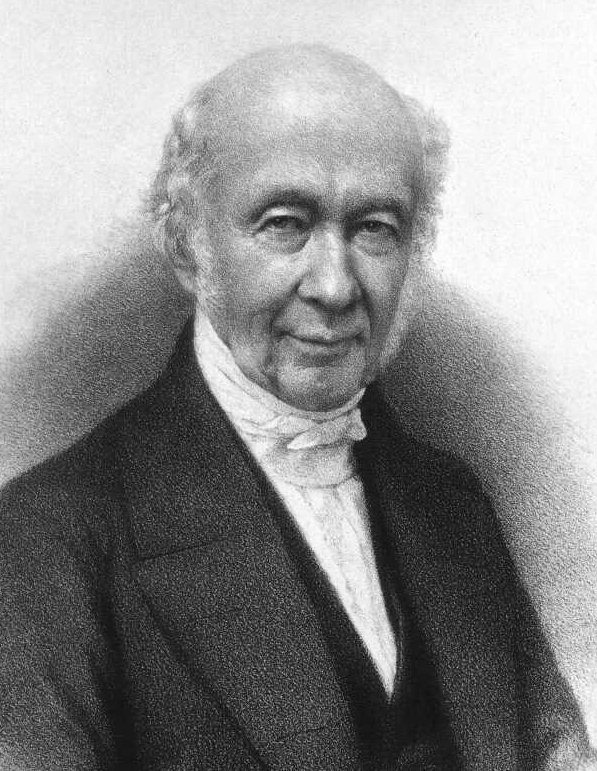
Reichenbach

In the 1840s and 1850s, Carl Reichenbach began experiments to find any scientific validity to "mesmeric" energy, which he called Odic force after the Norse god Odin. Although his conclusions were quickly rejected in the scientific community, they did undermine Mesmer's claims of mind control. In 1846, James Braid published an influential article, The Power of the Mind over the Body, attacking Reichenbach's views as pseudoscientific. James Esdaile (1805–1859) reported on 345 major operations performed using mesmeric sleep as the sole anesthetic in British India. The development of chemical anesthetics soon saw the replacement of hypnotism in this role. John Elliotson (1791–1868), an English surgeon, in 1834 reported numerous painless surgical operations that had been performed using mesmerism.

=== James Braid ===
==== Hypnotism and monoideism ====
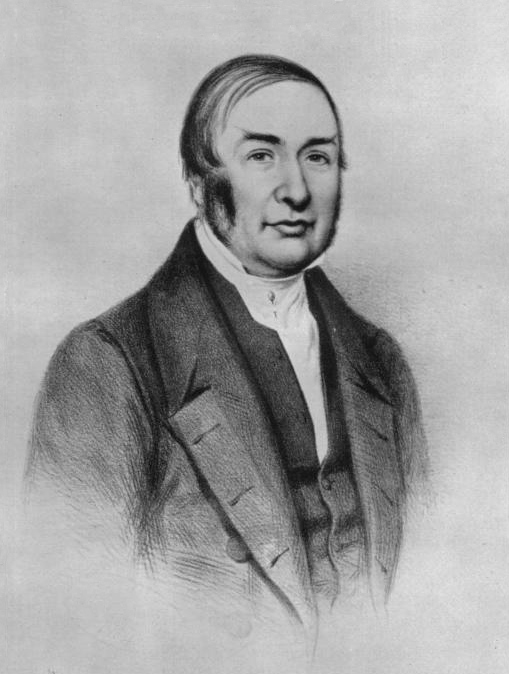
James Braid

James Braid (26 March 1851)

I shall conclude this [lecture] by a very simple mode of illustration, as respects the different points of view in which the mesmerists, the electro-biologists, and myself, stand toward each other in theory, by referring to the two theories of light contended for at the present time. Some believe in a positive emission from the sun of a subtile material, or imponderable influence, as the cause of light; whilst others deny this emission theory, and contend that light is produced by simple vibration excited by the sun, without any positive emission from that luminary. I may, therefore, be said to have adopted the vibratory theory, whilst the mesmerists and electro-biologists contend for the emission theory. But my experiments have proved that the ordinary phenomena of mesmerism may be realised through the subjective or personal mental and physical acts of the patient alone; whereas the proximity, acts, or influence of a second party, would be indispensably requisite for their production, if the theory of the mesmerists were true. Moreover, my experiments have proved that audible, visible, or tangible suggestions of another person, whom the subject believes to possess such power over him, is requisite for the production of the waking phenomena; whereas no audible, visible, or tangible suggestion from a second party ought to be required to produce these phenomena, if the theory of the electro-biologists were true.
There is, therefore, both positive and negative proof in favour of my mental and suggestive theory, and in opposition to the magnetic, occult, or electric theories of the mesmerists and electro-biologists. My theory, moreover, has this additional recommendation, that it is level to our comprehension, and adequate to account for all which is demonstrably true, without offering any violence to reason and common sense, or being at variance with generally admitted physiological and psychological principles. Under these circumstances, therefore, I trust that you will consider me entitled to your verdict in favour of my MENTAL THEORY.

The Scottish surgeon James Braid coined the term "hypnotism" in his unpublished Practical Essay on the Curative Agency of Neuro-Hypnotism (1842) as an abbreviation for "neuro-hypnotism", meaning "sleep of the nerves". Braid fiercely opposed the views of the Mesmerists, especially the claim that their effects were due to an invisible force called "animal magnetism", and the claim that their subjects developed paranormal powers such as telepathy. Instead, Braid adopted a skeptical position, influenced by the philosophical school of Scottish Common Sense Realism, attempting to explain the Mesmeric phenomena on the basis of well-established laws of psychology and physiology. Hence, Braid is regarded by many as the first true "hypnotist" as opposed to the Mesmerists and other magnetists who preceded him.

Braid ascribed the "mesmeric trance" to a physiological process resulting from prolonged attention to a bright moving object or similar object of fixation. He postulated that "protracted ocular fixation" fatigued certain parts of the brain and caused a trance – a "nervous sleep" or "neuro-hypnosis".

Later Braid simplified the name to "hypnotism" (from the Greek ὕπνος hypnos, "sleep"). Finally, realizing that "hypnotism" was not a kind of sleep, he sought to change the name to "monoideism" ("single-thought-ism"), based on a view centred on the notion of a single, dominant idea; but the term "hypnotism" and its later, misleading (circa 1885) Nancy-centred derivative "hypnosis", have persisted.

Braid is credited with writing the first ever book on hypnotism, Neurypnology (1843). After Braid's death in 1860, interest in hypnotism temporarily waned, and gradually shifted from Britain to France, where research began to grow, reaching its peak around the 1880s with the work of Hippolyte Bernheim and Jean-Martin Charcot.

==== Braid on Yoga ====
According to his writings, Braid began to hear reports concerning the practices of various meditation techniques immediately after the publication of his major book on hypnotism, Neurypnology (1843). Braid first discusses hypnotism's historical precursors in a series of articles entitled Magic, Mesmerism, Hypnotism, etc., Historically & Physiologically Considered. He draws analogies between his own practice of hypnotism and various forms of Hindu yoga meditation and other ancient spiritual practices. Braid's interest in meditation really developed when he was introduced to the Dabistān-i Mazāhib, the "School of Religions", an ancient Persian text describing a wide variety of Oriental religious practices:

Last May [1843], a gentleman residing in Edinburgh, personally unknown to me, who had long resided in India, favoured me with a letter expressing his approbation of the views which I had published on the nature and causes of hypnotic and mesmeric phenomena. In corroboration of my views, he referred to what he had previously witnessed in oriental regions, and recommended me to look into the "Dabistan", a book lately published, for additional proof to the same effect. On much recommendation I immediately sent for a copy of the "Dabistan", in which I found many statements corroborative of the fact, that the eastern saints are all self-hypnotisers, adopting means essentially the same as those which I had recommended for similar purposes.

Although he disputed the religious interpretation given to these phenomena throughout this article and elsewhere in his writings, Braid seized upon these accounts of Oriental meditation as proof that the effects of hypnotism could be produced in solitude, without the presence of a magnetiser, and therefore saw this as evidence that the real precursor of hypnotism was the ancient practices of meditation rather than in the more recent theory and practice of Mesmerism. As he later wrote,

Inasmuch as patients can throw themselves into the nervous sleep, and manifest all the usual phenomena of Mesmerism, through their own unaided efforts, as I have so repeatedly proved by causing them to maintain a steady fixed gaze at any point, concentrating their whole mental energies on the idea of the object looked at; or that the same may arise by the patient looking at the point of his own finger, or as the Magi of Persia and Yogi of India have practised for the last 2,400 years, for religious purposes, throwing themselves into their ecstatic trances by each maintaining a steady fixed gaze at the tip of his own nose; it is obvious that there is no need for an exoteric influence to produce the phenomena of Mesmerism. […] The great object in all these processes is to induce a habit of abstraction or concentration of attention, in which the subject is entirely absorbed with one idea, or train of ideas, whilst he is unconscious of, or indifferently conscious to, every other object, purpose, or action.

=== Holy See ===
Objections had been raised by some theologians stating that, if not applied properly, hypnosis could deprive a person of their faculty of reason. Saint Thomas Aquinas specifically rebutted this, stating that "The loss of reason is not a sin in itself but only by reason of the act by which one is deprived of the use of reason. If the act that deprives one of his use of reason is licit in itself and is done for a just cause, there is no sin; if no just cause is present, it must be considered a venial sin."

On 28 July 1847, a decree from the Sacred Congregation of the Holy office (Roman Curia) declared that "Having removed all misconception, foretelling of the future, explicit or implicit invocation of the devil, the use of animal magnetism (Hypnosis) is indeed merely an act of making use of physical media that are otherwise licit and hence it is not morally forbidden, provided it does not tend toward an illicit end or toward anything depraved."

=== American Civil War ===
Hypnosis was used by field doctors in the American Civil War and was one of the first extensive medical application of hypnosis. Although hypnosis seemed effective in the field, with the introduction of the hypodermic needle and the general chemical anesthetics of ether in 1846 and chloroform in 1847 to America, it was much easier for the war's medical community to use chemical anesthesia than hypnosis.

=== Jean-Martin Charcot ===
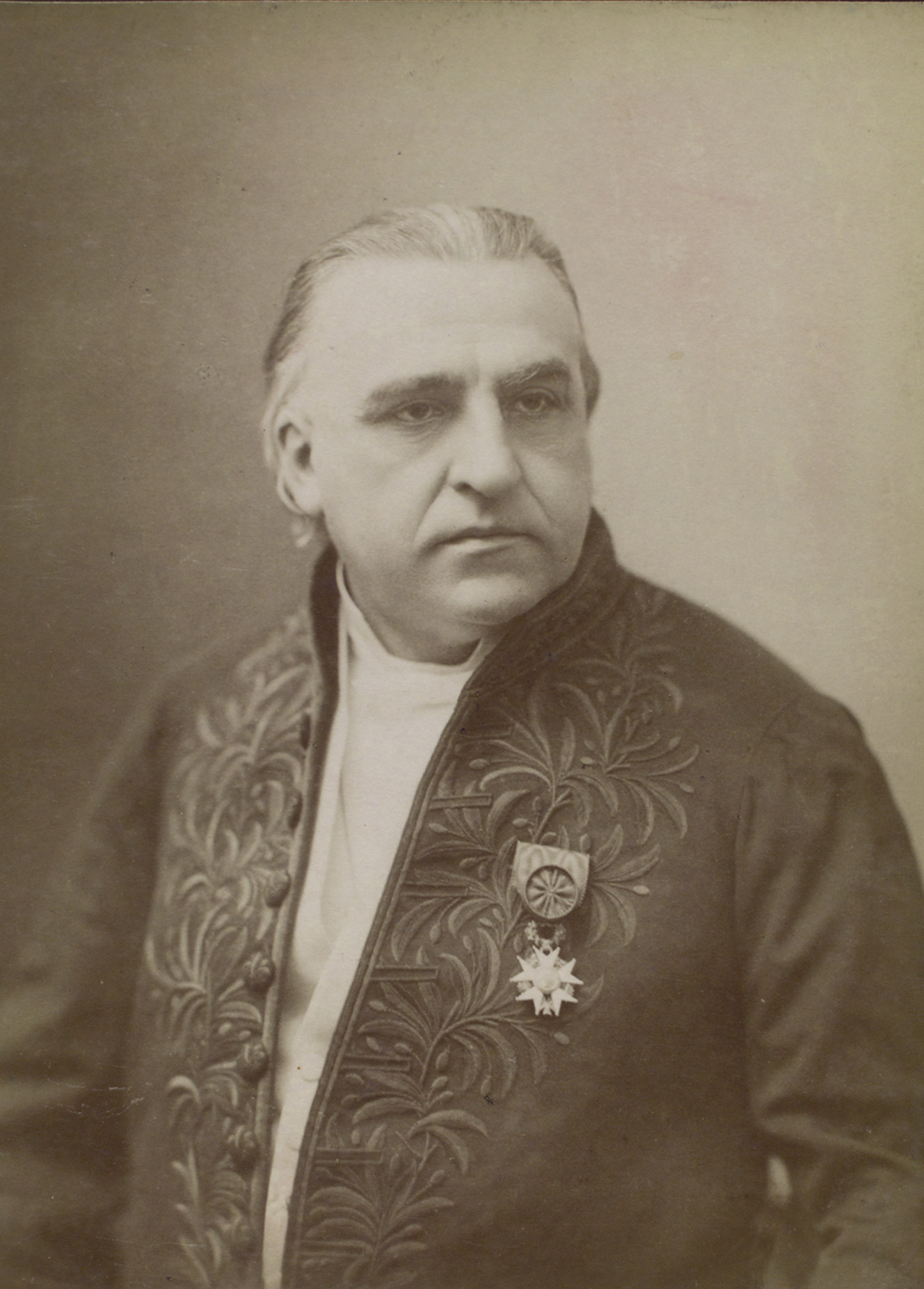
Jean-Martin Charcot

The neurologist Jean-Martin Charcot (1825–1893) endorsed hypnotism for the treatment of hysteria. La méthode numérique ("The numerical method") led to a number of systematic experimental examinations of hypnosis in France, Germany, and Switzerland. The process of post-hypnotic suggestion was first described in this period. Extraordinary improvements in sensory acuity and memory were reported in hypnosis.

From the 1880s the examination of hypnosis passed from surgical doctors to mental health professionals. Charcot had led the way and his study was continued by his pupil, Pierre Janet. Janet described the theory of dissociation, the splitting of mental aspects in hypnosis (or hysteria) so skills and memory could be made inaccessible or recovered. Janet provoked interest in the subconscious and laid the framework for reintegration therapy for dissociated personalities.

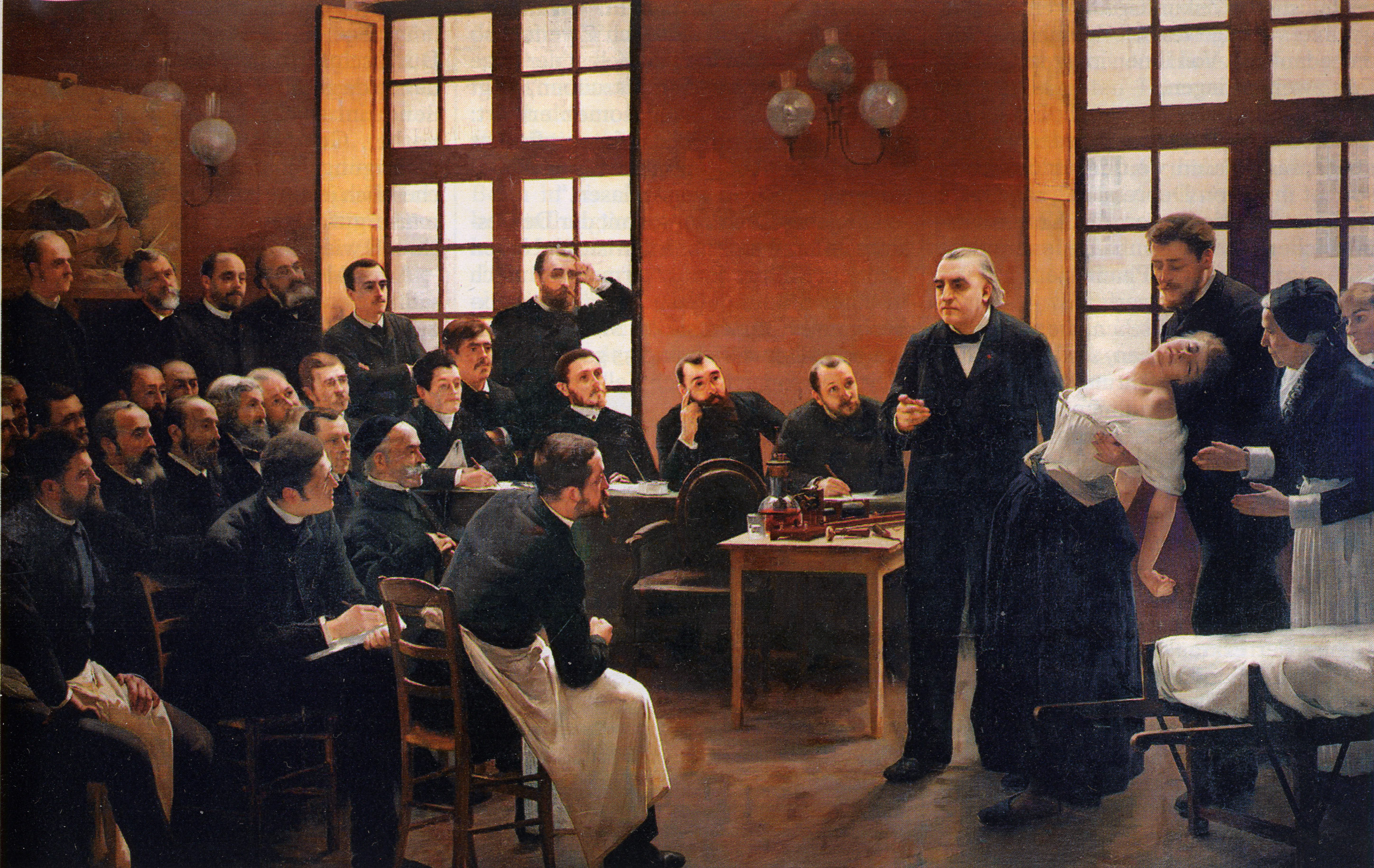
Charcot demonstrating hypnosis on a "hysterical" Salpêtrière patient, "Blanche" (Marie Wittman), who is supported by Joseph Babiński.

=== Ambroise-Auguste Liébeault ===
Ambroise-Auguste Liébeault (1864–1904) — along with Jules Liégeois (1833—1908), Henri-Étienne Beaunis (1830 –1921), and Hippolyte Bernheim (1840–1919), one of the founders of the Nancy School of Hypnosis — wrote of the necessity for cooperation between the operator and the subject for rapport to exist. Along with Bernheim, he emphasized the importance of suggestibility.

=== Hippolyte Bernheim ===
Some experts consider Bernheim to be the most important figure in the history of hypnotism. Along with Liébeault, Liégeois, and Beaunis he was one of the founders the Nancy School, which went on to become the dominant force in hypnotherapeutic theory and practice in the last two decades of the 19th century.

=== William James ===
William James (1842–1910), the pioneering American psychologist, discussed hypnosis in some detail in his Principles of Psychology.

=== Notable Hypnosis Conferences ===
The First International Congress for Experimental and Therapeutic Hypnotism was held in Paris, France, on 8–12 August 1889. Attendees included Jules Liégeois, Hippolyte Bernheim, Ambroise-Auguste Liébeault, Jean-Martin Charcot, and Sigmund Freud. The second congress was held on 12–16 August 1900.

The Annual Meeting of the British Medical Association, in 1892, unanimously endorsed the therapeutic use of hypnosis and rejects the theory of Mesmerism (animal magnetism). Even though the BMA recognized the validity of hypnosis, medical schools and universities largely ignored the subject.

== 20th century hypnotism ==
=== Emile Coué ===
Emile Coué (1857–1926), a French pharmacist – and, according to Charles Baudouin, the founder of the "New Nancy School" – having studied with Liébeault in 1885 and 1886, discarded the 'hypnosis' of Bernheim and Liébeault (c. 1886), adopted the 'hypnotism' of Braid (c. 1901), and created what became known as the Coué method (la méthode Coué), centred on the promotion of conscious autosuggestion.

His method was an ordered sequence of rational, systematic, intricately constructed, subject-centred hypnotherapeutic interactions that stressed the significance of both unconscious and conscious autosuggestion, delivered a collection of well-polished common-sense explanations, a persuasive set of experiential exercises, a powerfully efficacious hypnotism-centred ego-strengthening intervention and, finally, detailed instruction in the specific ritual through which his empirically determined formula "Every day, in every way, I'm getting better and better" was to be self-administered twice daily. Much of the work of early 20th century self-help teachers (such as Norman Vincent Peale, Robert H. Schuller, and W. Clement Stone) was derived from that of Coué.

=== Other early 20th century ===
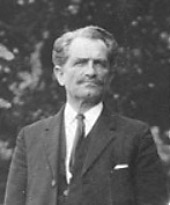
Boris Sidis

Boris Sidis (1867–1923), a Ukraine-born American psychologist and psychiatrist who studied under William James at Harvard University, formulated this law of suggestion:

Suggestibility varies as the amount of disaggregation, and inversely as the unification of consciousness. Disaggregation refers to the split between the normal waking consciousness and the subconscious.

The German psychiatrist Johannes Schultz adapted the theories of Abbe Faria and Emile Coué, identifying certain parallels to techniques in yoga and meditation. He called his system of self-hypnosis autogenic training.

Gustave Le Bon's study of crowd psychology compared the effects of a leader of a group to hypnosis. Le Bon made use of the suggestibility concept.

=== Sigmund Freud ===
Hypnosis, which at the end of the 19th century had become a popular phenomenon, in particular due to Charcot's public hypnotism sessions, was crucial in the invention of psychoanalysis by Sigmund Freud, a student of Charcot. Freud later witnessed a small number of the experiments of Liébeault and Hippolyte Bernheim in Nancy. Back in Vienna he developed abreaction therapy using hypnosis with Josef Breuer. When Sigmund Freud discounted its use in psychiatry, in the first half of the last century, stage hypnotists kept it alive more than physicians.

=== Platanov and Pavlov ===
Russian medicine has had extensive experience with obstetric hypnosis. Platanov, in the 1920s, became well known for his hypno-obstetric successes. Impressed by this approach, Stalin later set up a nationwide program headed by Velvoski, who originally combined hypnosis with Pavlov's techniques, but eventually used the latter almost exclusively. Fernand Lamaze, having visited Russia, brought back to France "childbirth without pain through the psychological method," which in turn showed more reflexologic than hypnotic inspiration.

=== 20th century wars ===
The use of hypnosis in the treatment of neuroses flourished in World War I, World War II and the Korean War. Hypnosis techniques were merged with psychiatry and was especially useful in the treatment of what is known today as Post Traumatic Stress Disorder.

=== William McDougall ===
William McDougall (1871–1944), an English psychologist, treated soldiers with "shell shock" and criticised certain aspects of Freudian theory such as the concept of abreaction.

=== Clark L. Hull ===
The modern study of hypnotism is usually considered to have begun in the 1920s with Clark Leonard Hull (1884–1952) at Yale University. An experimental psychologist, his work Hypnosis and Suggestibility (1933) was a rigorous study of the phenomenon, using statistical and experimental analysis. Hull's studies emphatically demonstrated once and for all that hypnosis had no connection with sleep ("hypnosis is not sleep, … it has no special relationship to sleep, and the whole concept of sleep when applied to hypnosis obscures the situation").

The main result of Hull's study was to rein in the extravagant claims of hypnotists, especially regarding extraordinary improvements in cognition or the senses under hypnosis. Hull's experiments showed the reality of some classical phenomena such as mentally induced pain reduction and apparent inhibition of memory recall. However, Clark's work made clear that these effects could be achieved without hypnosis being seen as a distinct state, but rather as a result of suggestion and motivation, which was a forerunner of the behavioural approach to hypnosis. Similarly, moderate increases in certain physical capacities and changes to the threshold of sensory stimulation could be induced psychologically; attenuation effects could be especially dramatic.

=== Andrew Salter ===
In the 1940s, Andrew Salter (1914–1996) introduced to American therapy the Pavlovian method of contradicting, opposing, and attacking beliefs. In the conditioned reflex, he has found what he saw as the essence of hypnosis. He thus gave a rebirth to hypnotism by combining it with classical conditioning. Ivan Pavlov had himself induced an altered state that he referred to as "Cortical Inhibition" in pigeons, which some later theorists believe was some form of hypnotic state.

=== 1956, Pope's approval of hypnosis ===
The Roman Catholic Church banned hypnotism until the mid-20th century when, in 1956, Pope Pius XII gave his approval of hypnosis. He stated that the use of hypnosis by health care professionals for diagnosis and treatment is permitted. In an address from the Vatican on hypnosis in childbirth, the Pope gave these guidelines:

1. Hypnotism is a serious matter, and not something to dabble in.
2. In its scientific use, the precautions dictated by both science and morality must be followed.
3. Under the aspect of anaesthesia, it is governed by the same principles as other forms of anaesthesia.

=== In the UK ===
In the United Kingdom, the Hypnotism Act 1952 was instituted to regulate stage hypnotists' public entertainments.

On 23 April 1955, the British Medical Association (BMA) approved the use of hypnosis in the areas of psychoneuroses and hypnoanesthesia in pain management in childbirth and surgery. At this time, the BMA also advised all physicians and medical students to receive fundamental training in hypnosis.

=== In the U.S. ===
In 1958, the American Medical Association approved a report on the medical uses of hypnosis. It encouraged research on hypnosis although pointing out that some aspects of hypnosis are unknown and controversial. However, in June 1987, the AMA's policy-making body rescinded all AMA policies from 1881 to 1958 (other than two not relating to hypnosis).

Two years after AMA approval, the American Psychological Association endorsed hypnosis as a branch of psychology.

=== Milton Erickson ===
Milton Hyland Erickson (5 December 1901 – 25 March 1980) was an American psychiatrist and psychologist specializing in medical hypnosis and family therapy. He was founding president of the American Society for Clinical Hypnosis and a fellow of the American Psychiatric Association, the American Psychological Association, and the American Psychopathological Association. He is noted for his approach to the unconscious mind as creative and solution-generating. He is also noted for influencing brief therapy, strategic family therapy, family systems therapy, solution focused brief therapy, and neuro-linguistic programming.

Milton Erickson dedicated his professional career to the advancement of the use of hypnosis in the context of medicine. He was committed to scientific methodology and a staunch advocate of the regulated professional training for practitioners. The investigations of Erickson in the first half of the 20th century were particularly influential on the second half. Erickson's clinical innovations on the practice of hypnosis are credited with inspiring its renaissance and arousing a new generation of practitioners. Studies continued after the Second World War. Barber, Hilgard, Orne and Sarbin also produced substantial studies.

=== Others ===
In 1961, Ernest Hilgard and André Muller Weitzenhoffer created the Stanford scales, a standardized scale for susceptibility to hypnosis, and properly examined susceptibility across age-groups and sex. Hilgard went on to study sensory deception (1965) and induced anesthesia and analgesia (1975).

Dave Elman (1900–1967) helped to promote the medical use of hypnosis from 1949 until his heart attack in 1962. Elman's definition of hypnosis is still used today by professional hypnotherapists. Although Elman had no medical training, Gil Boyne (a major teacher of hypnosis) repeatedly stated that Dave Elman trained more physicians and dentists in the use of hypnotism than anyone else in the United States. He is also known for introducing rapid inductions to the field of hypnotism. An induction method he introduced over fifty years ago is still one of the favored inductions used by many of today's practitioners.

He placed great stress on what he called "the Esdaile state" or the "hypnotic coma", which, according to Elman, had not been deliberately induced since Scottish surgeon James Esdaile last attained it. This was an unfortunate and historically inaccurate choice of terminology on Elman's part. Esdaile never used what we now call hypnosis even on a single occasion; he used something loosely resembling mesmerism (also known as animal magnetism).

=== Hypnotherapy ===
In the US, the Department of Labor Directory of Occupational Titles (D.O.T. 079.157.010) supplies the following definition of hypnotherapists:

"Hypnotherapist – Induces hypnotic state in client to increase motivation or alter behavior pattern through hypnosis. Consults with client to determine the nature of problem. Prepares client to enter hypnotic states by explaining how hypnosis works and what client will experience. Tests subject to determine degrees of physical and emotional suggestibility. Induces hypnotic state in client using individualized methods and techniques of hypnosis based on interpretation of test results and analysis of client's problem. May train client in self-hypnosis conditioning. Some states hold the term "Therapist" to be licensed medical professionals. Therefore, using this term and not being a licensed professional would be practicing without a license."

In the UK, The National Occupational Standards (NOS) for Hypnotherapy was published in 2002 by Skills for Health, the Government's Sector Skills Council for the UK health industry. The Qualifications and Curriculum Authority started conferring optional certificates and diplomas in international level through National Awarding Bodies by assessing learning outcomes of training/accrediting-prior-experiential-learning.

In India, the Ministry of Health & Family Welfare, Government of India, in its letter no.R.14015/25/96-U&H(R) (Pt.) dated 25 November 2003, has categorically stated that hypnotherapy is a recommended mode of therapy in India, to be practiced only by appropriately trained personnel.

== Contemporary researchers ==
=== Nicholas Spanos ===
Nicholas Spanos, who died in 1994, was Professor of Psychology and Director of the Laboratory for Experimental Hypnosis at Carleton University and a leading nonstate theorist and hypnotic skills training researcher.

=== Martin Orne ===
Martin Theodore Orne was a professor of psychiatry at the University of Pennsylvania who researched demand characteristics and hypnosis.

== See also ==
- A Clinical Lesson at the Salpêtrière – 1887 group tableau portrait by André Brouillet
- Autosuggestion – Psychological technique related to the placebo effect
- Female hysteria – Outdated diagnosis for women
- Hypnosis – State of increased suggestibility
- Hypnosis in popular culture – Portrayal of hypnosis and hypnotists in literature, film, and other fiction
- Hypnotherapy – Type of complementary and alternative medicine
- Hypnotic Ego-Strengthening Procedure – Hypnotherapeutic procedure
- Hypnotic induction – Hypnotic process
- Hypnotic susceptibility – Measure of how easily a person can be hypnotized
- Royal Commission on Animal Magnetism – 1784 French scientific bodies' investigations involving systematic controlled trials
- Self-hypnosis – Form, process, or result of a self-induced hypnotic state
- Suggestibility – Inclination to accept the suggestions of others
- Suggestion – Psychological process of guiding a person
- The Nancy School of Hypnosis – French school of psychotherapy from 1866
- The Salpêtrière School of Hypnosis – French school of psychotherapy from 1882
- The Zoist: A Journal of Cerebral Physiology & Mesmerism, and Their Applications to Human Welfare – Academic journal devoted to pseudoscientific concepts
