= Atholl Crescent =

Street in Perth, Scotland

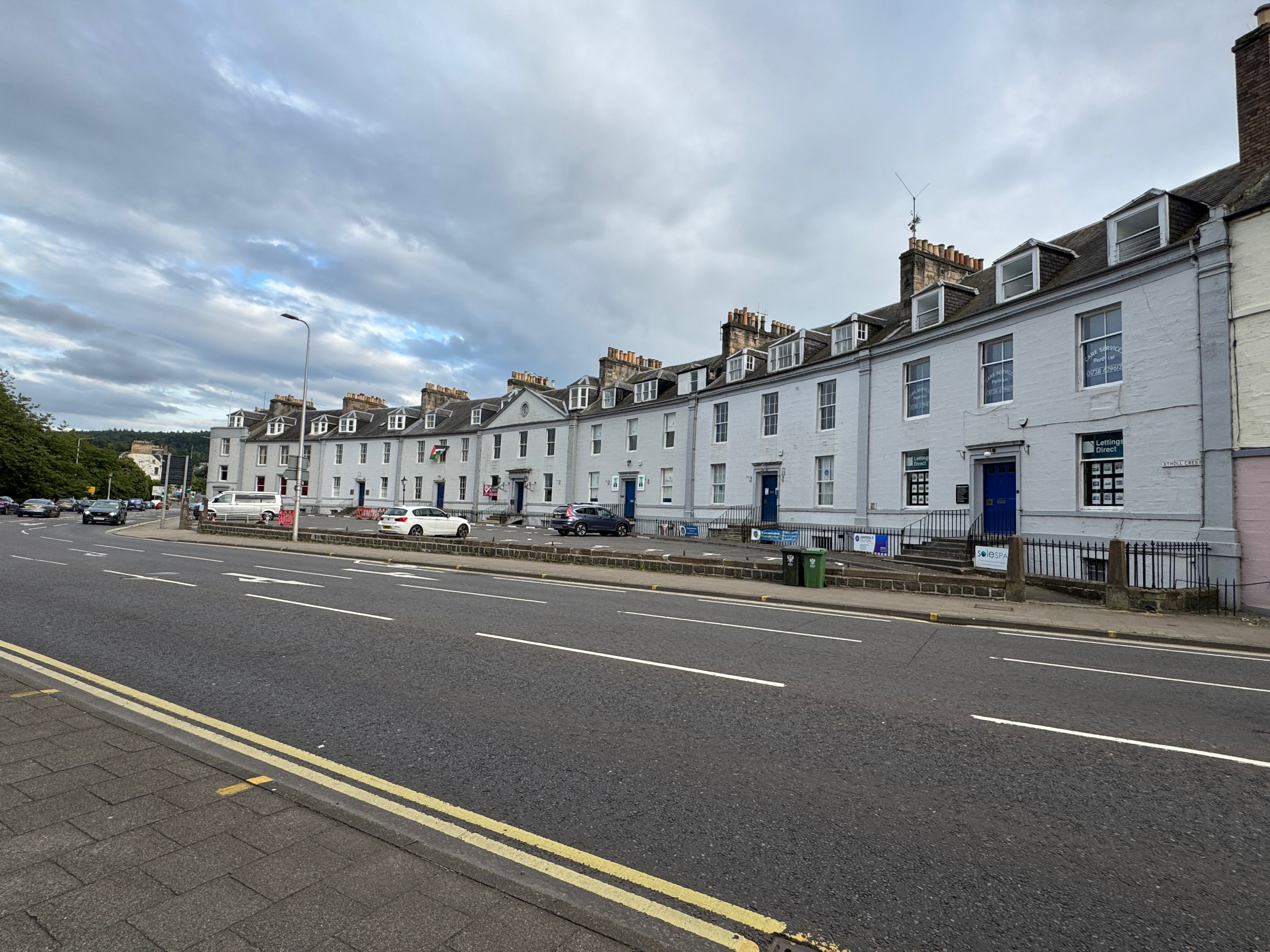
- The street in 2024
- Length: 0.06 mi (0.097 km)
- Location: Perth, Perth and Kinross, Scotland
- West end: Atholl Street
- West end: Charlotte Street

Construction
- Completion: Late 18th century

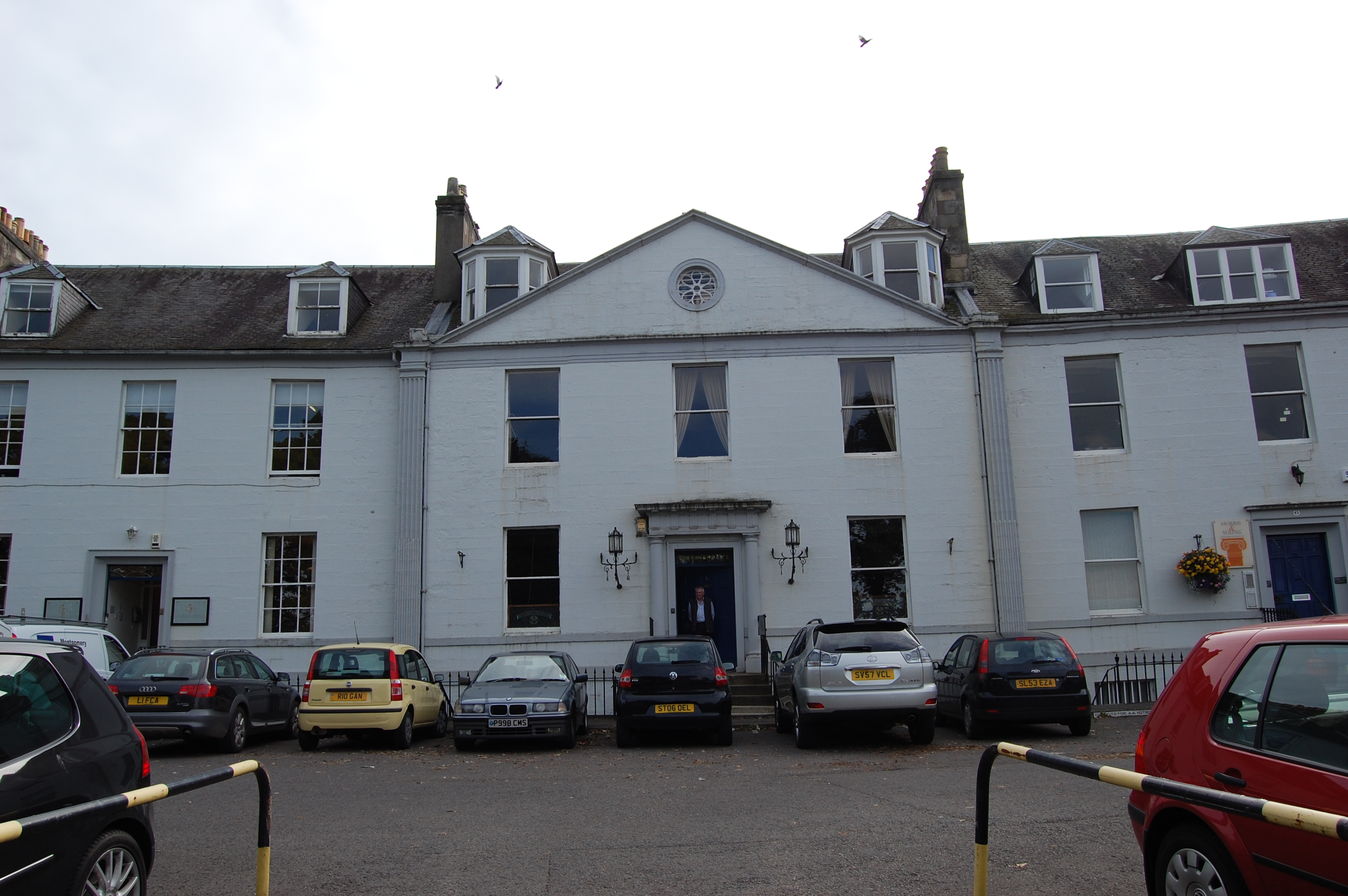
Number 5, the central structure in the crescent, pictured in 2008, when it was a masonic hall

Atholl Crescent is a historic street in the city of Perth, Scotland. Established in the late 18th century, it runs, in a crescent form, for about 315 feet (96 m), from Atholl Street in the west to Charlotte Street in the east (both part of the A989 Perth Ring Road). It overlooks the southern edge of the North Inch. Thomas Hay Marshall, twice lord provost of Perth, and substantial landowner Thomas Anderson, are credited with building Perth's Georgian "new town" to the north and south of the medieval city centre, of which Atholl Crescent and Atholl Street were the first constructions.

Perth developed from an initial plan of two parallel streets: South Street and High Street in the 15th century. Mill Street, to the north of High Street, followed shortly thereafter. High and South Streets became linked by several vennels leading north and south, and a couple more appeared that connected Mill Street to High Street. Kinnoull Street is the only road that connects to it throughout its quarter-mile length.

Despite its short length, seven buildings on the street (including the central number 5) are Category A listed; one is Category B listed.

Author Robert Hope Moncrieff lived at number 7 in the 19th century.

Perth Savings Bank was based in Atholl Crescent in the mid-19th century, prior to moving to nearby 26 Tay Street.

== Map ==
This 1832 map of Perth, by James Gardner, shows Atholl Crescent
