= Hypnosis in fiction =

Hypnosis has been a recurring theme in literature and popular culture since the nineteenth century, often associated with fascination, fear, and fantasy. A common and enduring way for writers to explain the trope of mind control in their works, early depictions drew on the mysterious aura of mesmerism and spiritualism, while later ones expanded to science fiction, crime thrillers, and horror. The vast majority of these depictions are exaggerated, and focus on negative stereotypes of either control for criminal profit and murder or as a method of seduction. Across decades, such portrayals rarely reflect clinical reality, emphasizing spectacle over scientific accuracy. The hypnotist, whether scientist, sorcerer, or spy, continues to embody society's anxieties about willpower, manipulation, and the boundaries of consciousness.

== Origins ==
Cover of Trilby (1894), one of the most influential early fiction works featuring the theme of hypnosis

The idea of hypnotic influence entered Western fiction (in particular, Gothic fiction) in the nineteenth century, initially through the popular fascination with mesmerism and its pseudoscientific claims, although similar ideas have been present in myth and literature for millennia (for example, in the Greek myth of the alluring voice of the sirens).

Authors such as Edgar Allan Poe explored psychological and metaphysical aspects of trance states in tales like "The Facts in the Case of M. Valdemar" (1845), where a dying man remains conscious under hypnotic control. Similar experiments with mesmerism appear in Nathaniel Hawthorne's The Blithedale Romance (1852) and in Edward Bulwer-Lytton's occult story The Haunted and the Haunters (1859). More seriously, Henry James used hypnotic states to facilitate social commentary in The Bostonians (1886).

Late Victorian fiction turned hypnosis into a cultural metaphor for danger, seduction, domination and loss of will. In particular, George du Maurier's Trilby (1894) popularized the archetype of the male hypnotist exerting irresistible control over a vulnerable woman—the character of Svengali becoming a byword for manipulative power (defined in Merriam-Webster as "a person who manipulates or exerts excessive control over another"). The motif soon appeared in Arthur Conan Doyle's The Parasite (1895), and film adaptations (but not the original text) of Bram Stoker's Dracula (1897), where vampiric gaze and hypnosis merge as forms of supernatural influence.

By the early twentieth century, hypnosis had become a familiar literary device linking crime, science, and the supernatural. It featured prominently in works such as Guy Boothby's Dr Nikola series (1895–1901) and Sax Rohmer's Fu Manchu novels (launched with The Mystery of Dr. Fu-Manchu in 1913), in which hypnotic powers served criminal ambitions, although it occasionally was a power used by heroes as well (for example, by Doc Savage who debuted in comics in 1933).

== 20th century ==
In works of fiction, from literature to film and television, hypnotic scenes frequently exaggerated the phenomenon as instantaneous and irresistible, presenting it as an almost magical form of domination. The hypnotist character often appears as a villain who manipulates others for crime, power, or sexual advantage, and this has led to the formation of negative stereotypes about hypnotism.

While these tropes begun in literature, cinema and television soon amplified them. The silent film The Cabinet of Dr. Caligari (1920) showed the titular Dr. Caligari commanding his sleepwalking servant Cesare to kill. Horror films such as Svengali (1931) reinforced the link between hypnosis, sexual tension, and moral corruption. From the mid-twentieth century onward, television programs such as Doctor Who and The X-Files used hypnosis to depict manipulation and psychic control. This has also been a feature in mainstream comics, such as Batman (1966–68) and Wonder Woman (1975–79); comic book villains with hypnotist powers included ones like Mad Hatter, Pied Piper and Universo from DC Comics and the Enchantress, Mesmero, and the Ringmaster from Marvel Comics.

Exaggerated powers of hypnosis often appear in works of science fiction, horror and fantasy. There, works often treat hypnosis as a psi power and an emblem of psychic superiority—a mental ability comparable to telepathy or mind control. In Frank Herbert's Dune (1965) the Bene Gesserit use "the Voice" to compel obedience, while in Martin Caidin's The God Machine (1969) it is used by a computer (AI) to control the world. Science fiction further expanded hypnosis into speculative technology. As early as mid-1930s Wallace West used the concept of subliminal advertising to suggest one popular avenue for hypnosis (The Phantom Dictator). In A. E. van Vogt's Slan (1940), hypnotic crystals amplify telepathic power, while his later The War Against the Rull (1959) introduced visual patterns that compel obedience. The Prisoner episode "The General" (1967) featured hypnotic teaching machines, echoing earlier fiction about "hypnopaedia" or sleep learning (ex. John W. Campbell's "The Brain Stealers of Mars" (1936)). Self-hypnosis also becomes a vehicle for time travel in works like Jack Finney's Time and Again (1970) and Richard Matheson's Bid Time Return (1975). The She Creature (1956) extended hypnotic regression to evolution itself, with characters reverting to prehistoric forms. Films like The Manchurian Candidate (1962, 2004) and Looker (1981) transformed hypnosis into a metaphor for political brainwashing, reflecting Cold War fears of mind control, as nineteenth-century anxieties about criminal manipulation evolved into twentieth-century fears of propaganda and subliminal persuasion. Hypnotic techniques allowed one to study past lives, reincarnation and genetic memory On a Clear Day You Can See Forever (1970) and Some Other Place. The Right Place (1973) by Donald Harington. Some rationalization of this was done through tying powerful hypnosis to strong pheromones in John Brunner's Children of the Thunder (1989) or a virus in Jessica Jones (2015-2019).

Fantastic literature often attributes hypnotic powers to nonhuman beings. Stories of hypnotic control, continuing from the early Dracula era, recur regularly, extended beyond vampires to aliens and mutants, from James Corbett's Devil-Man from Mars (1935) to Ian Watson's Converts (1984).

== More balanced or realistic depictions ==
While most portrayals emphasize danger or deceit (education being one of the few more positive dimensions), some works present hypnosis in a therapeutic or neutral light; these are however rather rare. Barrett identifies examples in movies such as Equus (1977), Agnes of God (1985) and Mesmer (1994), which engage seriously with psychological themes rather than sensationalized mind control. Brian M. Stableford in the context of literature noted that John D. MacDonald's "Cosmetics'' (1948) and Theodore Sturgeon's The Other Man (1956) "featuring constructive accounts of hypnotherapy... occupy an uneasy situation on the genre's fringe".

However, even such portrayals can distort the actual science. Hypnosis in fiction is generally portrayed as much more powerful than in reality, and is a common way for writers to explain the trope of mind control in their works. The popular association of hypnosis with memory recovery or even recovering memories of past lives, understood by lay people as a form of a mysterious key to hidden truths, as well as pseudoscience and the occult, have in fact caused reputational damage to scientific study and use of hypnosis.

== See also ==
- Hypnotic induction
- History of hypnosis
