= 26 Tay Street =

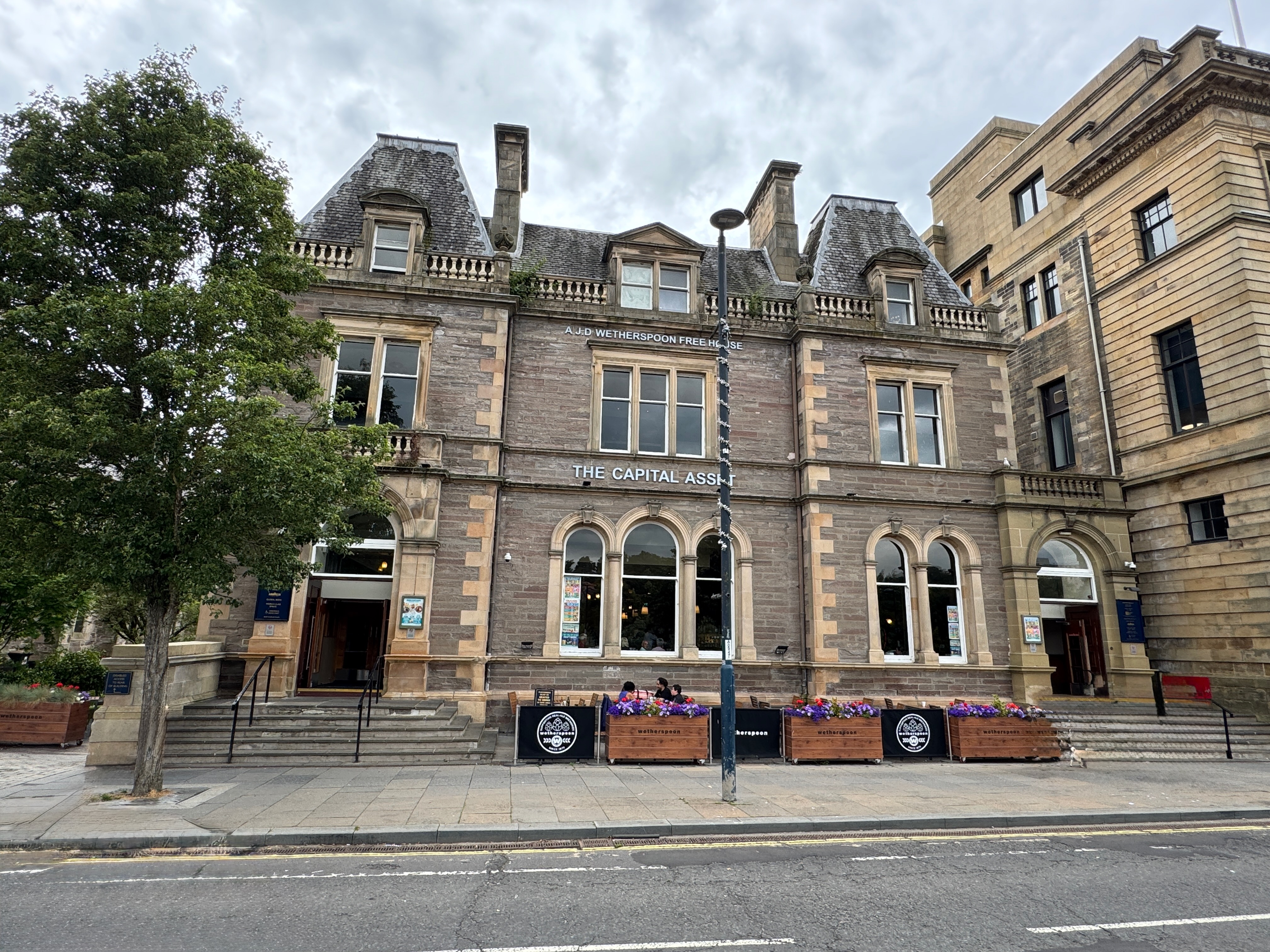
- The building in 2024

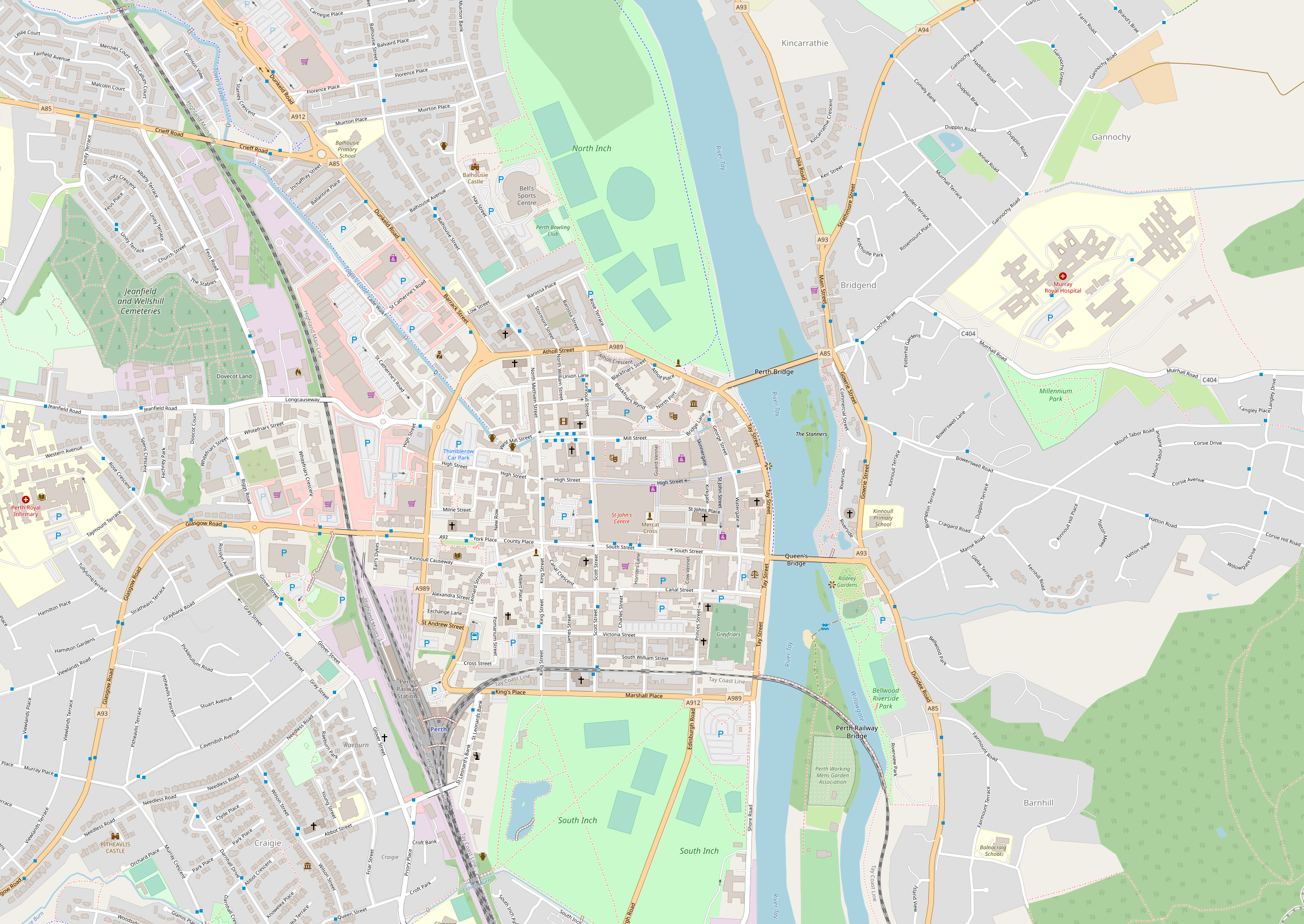
- Shown in Perth
- 56.39645°N 3.42598419°W
- Location: 26 Tay Street, Perth, Scotland

History
- Built: c. 1873 (153 years ago)

Site notes
- Architect: Andrew Heiton
- Architectural style: Mid-Victorian Renaissance

Listed Building – Category B
- Designated: 20 May 1965
- Reference no.: LB39655

26 Tay Street is an historic building in Perth, Scotland. Designed by local architect Andrew Heiton, the building is Category B listed, dating to around 1873. Standing on Tay Street, between St Matthew's Church to the south and the Perth and Kinross Council offices at 2 High Street to the north, the building is currently the home of The Capital Asset, a Wetherspoons establishment.

The building was formerly the home of Perth Savings Bank (having previously been located on nearby Atholl Crescent), which is when the building was extended, to a design by Robert Matthew Mitchell.

== See also ==
- List of listed buildings in Perth, Scotland
