= Hypnoid state =

The hypnoid state is a theory of the origins of hysteria published jointly by Josef Breuer and Sigmund Freud in their Preliminary communication of 1893, subsequently reprinted as the first chapter of Studies on Hysteria (1895).

For Breuer and Freud, who characterised the hypnoid state as a state of absence of mind/consciousness produced by intense daydreams of a mournful or sexual nature, "the existence of hypnoid states forms the foundation and condition of hysteria".

== Characteristics ==
The hypnoid state was seen as one resembling but not identical with hypnosis. In the hypnoid state, one may have dream-like experiences. One enters the hypnoid state by either hypnosis or by voluntary amnesia.

Breuer credited Paul Julius Möbius as a forerunner in the development of the idea.

== Repudiation ==
Freud was shortly to repudiate the causative notion of hypnoid states, in favour of his theory of psychological repression. As he would put it later, "Breuer's theory of 'hypnoid states' turned out to be impeding and unnecessary, and it has been dropped by psycho-analysis today...the screen of hypnoid states erected by Breuer".

Nevertheless, he continued to recognise the importance of such states of absent consciousness in the symptomatology of the hysterical subject.

== See also ==
- Amnesia
- Anna O.
- Hypnosis
- Hypnotic induction
- Psychoanalytic theory
- Splitting (psychology)
