= James Esdaile (minister) =

Scottish minister and writer (1775–1854)

James Esdaile (1775–1854) was a Scottish minister and writer who spent his working life mainly at the East Church, Perth, Scotland.

== Life ==
Esdaile began as a tutor in the family of James Christie of Durie. He then studied at the University of St Andrews. He was licensed by the presbytery of Kirkcaldy on 15 June 1803; and was ordained to Montrose, on 14 August 1805. He was admitted as minister in Perth in November 1810.

Esdaile was awarded the degree of D.D. by the University of Edinburgh, 4 January 1838. He resigned his position 15 June 1844; and died 8 January 1854.

== Works ==
Esdaile wrote the prominent article "Logic" in the Edinburgh Encyclopædia, divided as Part I pneumatology, part II dialectics. Here "pneumatology" is what now would be called psychology, and was handled in line with the natural theology of the Enlightenment. It proved a source of controversy with Thomas Brown, whom Esdaile accused of plagiarism, based largely on the use of the term "Relationist". It also gave the author's opinion that Francis Bacon's influence on the advances of two centuries in natural philosophy was largely restricted to chemistry. Esdaile was considered a candidate for the Chair of Moral Philosophy at Edinburgh in 1820, on Brown's death, at least in the eyes of some supporters of the Church of Scotland. In the event John Wilson was elected over the claims of Sir William Hamilton.

Esdaile's theological works were:

- Christian Theology: Or, A Connected View of the Scheme of Christianity (Edinburgh, 1823)
- Apocrypha (Perthshire Bible Society, Perth, 1826);
- Lectures on the Shorter Catechism (Perth, 1829).

Two local controversies generated pamphlet wars:

- A Letter to the Rev. W. A. Thomson: In Answer to His "Reply," &c." (1826). Against William Aird Thomson (1773–1863) of the Middle Parish, Perth.
  - Dr. Thomson's two last letters to the editor of the Perthshire Courier, exposing the inconsistencies of Mr. Esdaile, and his doctrine of two standards of the Bible: with remarks on the conduct of the editor, and the notes of "a correspondent", respecting two standards of the pound weight and of the word of God (1829).
- Debate with David Young of Perth, who was the junior minister in the North Church, in which Esdaile maintained the orthodox position in the Voluntary Controversy which ran in Scotland from 1829 to the Disruption of 1843:
  - Ecclesiastical establishments opposed alike to political equity and Christian law (1833, Young);
  - Civil and Religious Institutions necessarily and inseparably connected (Perth, 1833, Esdaile);
  - Reply to the Rev. James Esdaile's examination of the Rev. D. Young's pamphlet on ecclesiastical establishments (1833, Young);
  - The Voluntary Church Scheme without Foundation in Scripture, Reason, or Common Sense (Perth, 1834, Esdaile);
  - A vindication of scripture, reason and common sense in reply to the Rev. James Esdaile's second pamphlet on establishment (Young);
  - The Spirit, Principles, and Reasoning of the Voluntaries Exposed (Perth, 1834, Esdaile).

== Perth Savings Bank ==
James Esdaile was one of the founding directors of the Perth Savings Bank and its unpaid Secretary from its formation in 1815 to his retirement in 1839.

== Family ==
Esdaile married, at Borgue, on 3 December 1805, Margaret Blair (died at Rescobie, Angus, Scotland, 24 May 1843), daughter of David Blair of Borgue. Their children were:

- James Esdaile M.D., H.E.I.C., Marine Surgeon, Calcutta. Author of Mesmerism in India, and Its Practical Application in Surgery and Medicine (1846), etc. He was born in Montrose, Angus, on 6 February 1808, and died at Sydenham, Kent on 10 January 1859. He married three times. His first wife, Mary Ann Christie — whom he had married, in Scotland, on 6 June 1838, whilst on furlough — died on their voyage to India ("in her 18th year") on 9 November 1838. His second wife, Sophia Ullmann, whom he married on 17 November 1842 while stationed at Hooghly, died in Calcutta on 27 July 1850, aged 44. He married his third wife, Eliza Morton (1807-1862) (née Weatherhead) in Calcutta on 3 February 1851.
- David, D.D., minister of Rescobie, Angus, Scotland, born 6 February 1811, who, with his brother James, founded the Esdaile College in 1860 a Ministers' Daughters' College, on Kilgraston Road in Edinburgh, which closed in 1972; he died 10 June 1880
- John, born 9 December 1813; married Mary Ann Fairbanks (1826-aft.1871) and died in Halifax, Nova Scotia, Canada, 1877.
- Robert, born 21 November 1816, who emigrated to Canada, and was in business there with his brother John.; married Nancy Fisher Mackenzie; died 5 July 1882
- Janet (1818–1819).

== See also ==
- James Esdaile
