= Perth Savings Bank =

Bank in Perth, Scotland

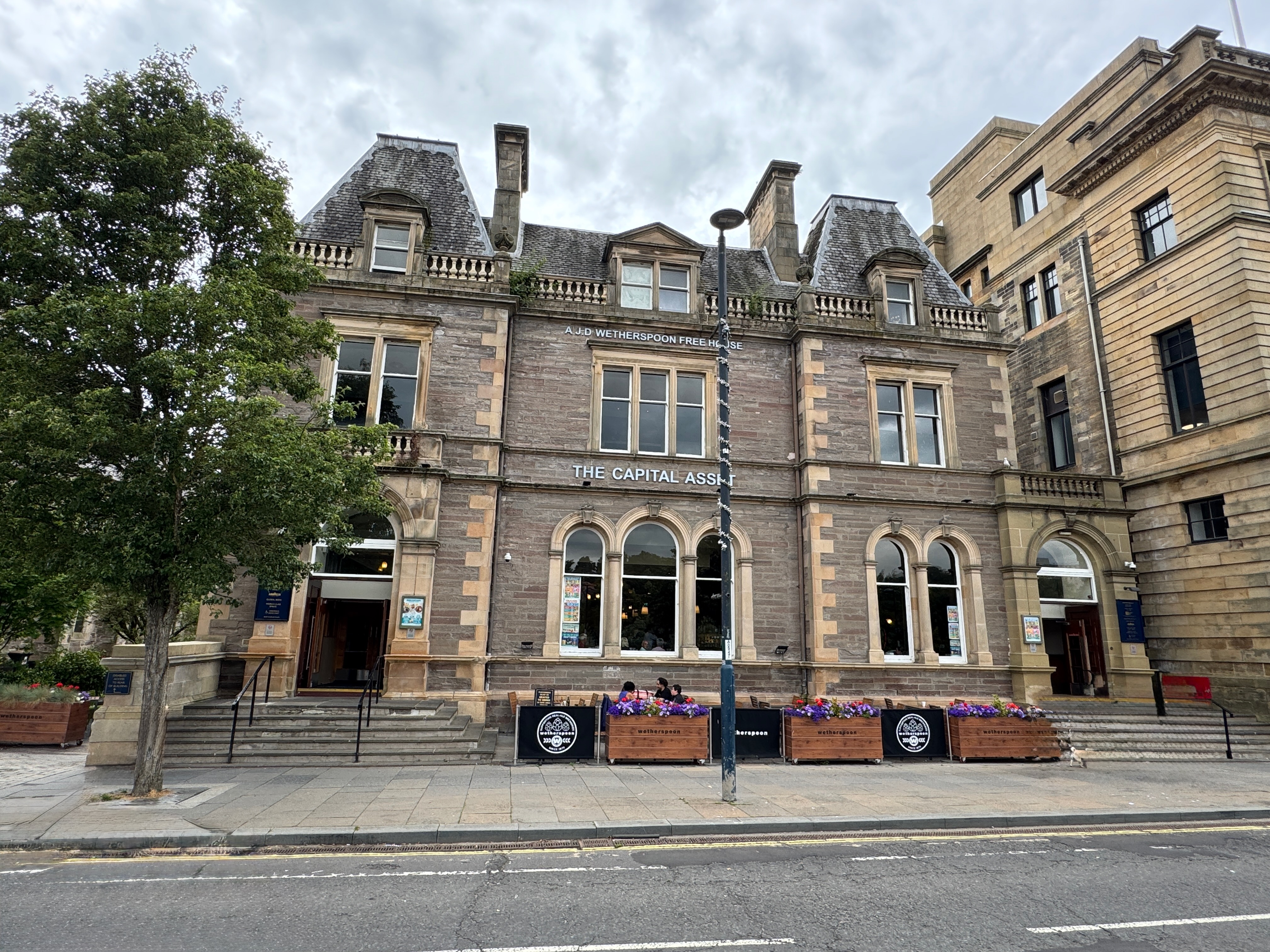
- The bank's former Tay Street location, pictured in 2024
- Founded: 1815
- Defunct: 1975
- Fate: Absorbed into Trustee Savings Bank of Tayside and Central Scotland
- Headquarters: Perth, Scotland

The Perth Savings Bank was established in Perth, Scotland, in 1815. In 1975, it merged to form part of the Trustee Savings Bank of Tayside and Central Scotland.

== History ==
The Perth Savings Bank began in a small way on 17 April 1815, when the Chief Magistrate called "a score of citizens" to a meeting to consider the establishment of a savings bank. The objective was to be "the promotion of economy, sobriety, and industry in the working classes of the community". The meeting approved the proposal and appointed "a committee of local gentlemen" to report on the correct regulations. Three days later, the report was completed. The Bank was to be open for one hour on Monday mornings "to receive such small sums as might be saved from the savings of tradesmen, mechanics, labourers and servants..." The funds were to be invested in the Perth Banking Company which also provided a room for the Savings Bank to operate. Perth Savings Bank opened on the 11 May, less than a month after the inaugural meeting.

The first secretary was a local church minister and prominent theologian, the Revd. James Esdaile. He ran the bank on a voluntary basis until his retirement in 1839, but the official history was not kind to his tenure, recording that the bank "was conducted for 24 years on the primitive lines originally laid down, but the restrictions imposed ... by the rules, together with the inadequate facilities provided for public business, retarded the natural development and expansion of the bank.” There were no paid officers and directors shared the duties.

The end of the Revd. Esdaile's period as Secretary saw significant changes. A leading spirit was Melville Jameson, Procurator Fiscal of the County of Perth, one of the founders of the Bank and the new Secretary. The bank had never registered under any act of parliament and a proposal was made in 1838 for Bank to be registered under the Scotland 1835 Act and a new constitution was adopted in 1839, named the Savings Bank of the County and City of Perth. The history noted the difference from the Edinburgh and Glasgow savings banks, which used the 1835 Act to form new banks; the Perth Savings Bank was continuous from 1815.

The new management determined to expand into the County of Perth. In 1839, branches were opened at Coupar Angus and Blairgowrie, supplemented by receiving agencies in Stanley and Methil, and a third branch was opened in Crieff in 1840. Two more branches followed in the mid-1840s and additional receiving agencies in neighbouring villages. By 1847 the trustees reported that "almost the whole of the towns of any importance in the county are now accommodated with branch offices and other localities participate in the advantage of this institution by the system of receiving agencies." The bank also moved into independent accommodation in Atholl Crescent. Another change in 1839 was that the Savings Bank's funds were moved from the Perth Banking Company to be wholly invested with the government. In 1847, the bank established a special investment company to get a better rate for depositors and an increase in the amount that could be invested. The impact on the bank's size from these changes was substantial. In 1839, there were 859 accounts and deposits of £3,000; by 1850, however, there were 7,133 accounts with deposits of £102,000. Deposits doubled by 1860, and five more branches were opened between then and Pitlochry in 1911. The expansion in the customer base meant a further move in premises to Charlotte Street and then to a permanent building at 26 Tay Street in 1876. By 1914, there were over 33,000 accounts and deposits of £1.6m.

Little is published on the bank after the publication of the official history. The bank retained its independence until 1975 when, following the Page Report's recommendation on consolidation, it merged to form part of the Trustee Savings Bank of Tayside and Central Scotland.
