= Hobby Express =

Hobby Express is an American retailer that sells radio-controlled aircraft, helicopters, boats and related products through catalog and Internet sales, and operates a store in Tennessee. It was called Hobby Lobby International before changing its name in 2013 to avoid confusion with Hobby Lobby, an arts and crafts retailer then participating in a U.S. Supreme Court case.

The company was started in 1963 by James Martin. It was sold in 2003 to GenCap America and remained headquartered in Brentwood, Tennessee. In 2009, Hobby-Lobby International was sold to Mark Cleveland of Brentwood.
