= James Corbett (author) =

English author and journalist

- Born: Liverpool, England
- Occupation: Writer
- Writing career
- Period: 2002–present
- Subject: Sport
- Notable work: Faith of our Families

James Anthony Charles Corbett (born 12 November 1978) is an English author and journalist, best known for his writing about Everton F.C.

== Education and career ==
Corbett was brought up in Liverpool and educated at the London School of Economics.

As a journalist Corbett has reported from all over the world for the BBC, The Guardian, The Observer, The Independent, The Blizzard and numerous other publications. He is considered an expert on the affairs of football’s world governing body, FIFA, and has spoken at international conferences on the subject. He is currently correspondent for football website Off the Pitch.

== Publications ==
His non-fiction books include his collaboration with the legendary goalkeeper Neville Southall, The Binman Chronicles, named by Talksport as one of the 10 best sports books of all time, and Faith of our Families, longlisted in the 2018 British Sports Book of the Year awards.

His first novel, The Outsiders, a love story and mystery set against the backdrop of Liverpool's fall and rise, was published by Lightning Books in 2021 and shortlisted for the Portico Prize.

== Private life ==
He lives and works between his home in Ireland and home city of Liverpool.
