= Dave Elman =

American radio host, comedian & songwriter

Dave Elman (May 6, 1900 – December 5, 1967), birth name David Kopelman, was a noted Jewish American radio host, comedian, and songwriter, and important figure in the field of hypnosis. He is most known today as the author of Findings in Hypnosis (1964). Over the course of his life, he was also well known as the creator and host of the popular radio show Hobby Lobby as well as a songwriter and lyricist.

== Early life ==
Dave Elman was born David Kopelman to Jewish parents Jacob and Lena on May 6, 1900, in Park River, North Dakota. In 1902, the family moved to Fargo, where they started a business on Front Street making wigs, switches, and related performance equipment.

In 1906, they moved their wig-making business to the Kopelman Building, which they had built at 514 1st Street. In the basement, they provided mikvah services so Jewish women in the community could purify themselves through special cleansing. Lena also began a hairdressing shop next door.

Soon thereafter, Jacob was diagnosed with cancer. When a family friend relieved the intractable pain quite rapidly with hypnosis, Elman set about learning these techniques from him and began to realize the vast possibilities of hypnosis in the relief of pain outside of traditional medical procedures.

Jacob died in November 1908, leaving his pregnant wife with six children. In his early teens, Elman worked odd jobs to help the family. He was a talented musician on the saxophone and violin, and used his quick wit and love of entertaining to perform within the community as a comic.

== Career and later life ==
Elman's performing eventually led to the vaudeville circuit, and he moved to New York in 1922. His stage name in vaudeville was Elman, shortened from Kopelman when his billing as "The World's Youngest and Fastest Hypnotist" did not fit on marquees or promotional material. After being unsatisfied working the nightclubs, he later got a job working for music publishers. It was at this time that Dave became acquainted with the famous blues composer and musician W. C. Handy, with whom he worked for some years. The most well-known songs the duo wrote during this period were "Atlanta Blues", which was later recorded by dozens of other artists including Louis Armstrong, and "Oh Papa!", which was later recorded by Odetta. It was while working with Handy that he met his future wife, Pauline Reffe.

During the years 1923–1928, Elman was anxious to break into radio. In 1928, he got his first job with WHN, a large radio station in New York City. Soon after, he was hired by Columbia Broadcasting System (CBS), New York, where he became known as an idea man. He wrote, produced, directed, and performed in his own shows as well as others. He wrote a number of Kate Smith shows.

In 1937, he approached NBC with an idea for a new show: "Ordinary people would become advocates about their unusual hobbies", which were to be judged by an invited celebrity. NBC approved, and, on October 6, 1937, Elman debuted Hobby Lobby. The show became popular, and thousands of letters came in each week from people who wanted to talk about their hobbies. Many celebrities also sought to be on Elman's show. When Elman went on vacation on August 2, 1939, First Lady Eleanor Roosevelt accepted the invitation to be his replacement as host. Later, when he was hospitalized for a gallbladder operation, Roosevelt was once more the interim host. She also collaborated with Dave Elman on a movie advocating the use of hobbies as activities for soldiers, which she described in her "My Diary" newspaper column. During World War two and at the behest of the Roosevelts, Elman used his Hobby Lobby radio platform to run Victory Auctions to raise money for the war effort. He raised $25,000,000 and was awarded commendation from the War Department. Hobby Lobby was on the air until 1948.

In 1949, Elman decided to pursue teaching hypnosis to people in the medical professions, primarily doctors and dentists. From 1949 through 1962, he traveled extensively throughout America teaching his training course in hypnosis as a series of lessons called "Medical Relaxation" which he published as audio recordings. He also recorded a series of recordings entitled "Hypno-Analysis" which were actual sessions in hypnosis that he referenced for his course. In 1963, after a long illness, he decided to write his findings on the subject. It was a 336-page book which he dictated to his wife, Pauline, a stenographer, and then gave to his son Robert Elman, an author and editor to edit. He copyrighted and self-published the book in 1964 under the title Findings in Hypnosis. Elman died suddenly on December 5, 1967, having recovered from a heart attack five years earlier.

== See also ==
- History of hypnosis

== Books and Recordings ==
- 1956 "Medical Relaxation" lectures. Sound recording, Self-published. Clifton, New Jersey
- 1956 "Medical Relaxation in Obstetrics", "Anyone Can Relax", "The House of Relaxation". Lectures. Sound recording, Self-published, Clifton, New Jersey
- 1956 "The Fairy's Magic Game", 2 lectures, Sound recording. Self-published, Clifton, New Jersey
- 1961 "Reference Notes for the Dave Elman Course in Medical Hypnosis" Self-published, Clifton, New Jersey
- 1964 Findings in Hypnosis. Self-published. Clifton, New Jersey
- 1970 Explorations in Hypnosis [posthumous publication]. Nash Pub. ISBN 0-8402-1143-0
- 1977 Hypnotherapy (unauthorized title), Westwood Publishing, Glendale, Ca. ISBN 0-930298-04-7
