= James Esdaile =

Scottish surgeon

James Esdaile, M.D., E.I.C.S., Bengal (1808–1859), an Edinburgh trained Scottish surgeon, who served for twenty years with the East India Company, is a notable figure in the history of "animal magnetism" and, in particular, in the history of general anaesthesia.

== Family ==
The eldest son of the Rev. James Esdaile, D.D. (1775–1854), a minister of the Church of Scotland, and Margaret Blair (1781–1843), he was born in Montrose, Angus, Scotland on 6 February 1808. He died in Sydenham, Kent on 10 January 1859.

He had three brothers, David Esdaile, D.D. (1811–1880) — an ordained cleric, who, along with James Esdaile (his brother), founded Edinburgh’s Ministers’ Daughters’ College (later known as Esdaile School), dedicated to the education of the daughters of Ministers of the Church of Scotland, and of Professors in the Universities of Scotland — John Esdaile (1813–1877) and Robert Esdaile (1816–1882), both of whom migrated to Canada, and one sister, Janet (1818–1819).

He married three times.

- His first wife, Mary Ann Christie, whom he had married on 6 June 1838, whilst on furlough in Scotland, died on 9 November 1838, "in her 18th year", on their voyage to India (they left England on 24 July 1838).
- His second wife, Sophia Ullmann — daughter of the Delaware banker, John James Ullmann (1754–1811) and Jeanne F. Ullmann (née LeFranc), and the sister of lawyer and, later, (Union) General Daniel Ullmann (1810–1892) — whom he married on 17 November 1842 at Chinsurah, while stationed at Hooghly, died in Calcutta on 27 July 1850, aged 44.
- He married his third wife, Eliza Morton (1807–1862) (née Weatherhead) in Calcutta on 3 February 1851.

== Education ==
He studied medicine at the University of Edinburgh, graduating M.D. in 1829.

== India ==
In 1830, he was appointed as Civil Assistant Surgeon to the East India Company, and arrived in Calcutta, Bengal (which was, then, the capital of Company government), in 1831.

Having suffered from chronic bronchitis and asthma since his adolescence, Esdaile thought that India's different climate would be of benefit. Five years later, he suffered a total breakdown while working at Azamgarh, in Uttar Pradesh, and, later, was given an extended furlough from 1836 to 1838. During this time he travelled extensively; and his 1839 work, Letters from the Red Sea, Egypt, and the Continent, was written as a result of these travels.

He returned from his furlough to Calcutta, and was soon appointed as Civil Surgeon to the small Hooghli Imambara Hospital; and, through this appointment, he was also responsible for the hospital at Hooghly Jail. From November 1839 to December 1841 Esdaile also served as the Principal of the prestigious Hooghly College, located in the palladian mansion in Chinsurah that had been originally designed and built for "General Perron". The College had been founded in August 1836 by the Bengali philanthropist Haji Muhammad Mohsin, and Esdaile replaced the College's original principal — another surgeon, Thomas Alexander Wise, M.D. (1802–1889) — who had been promoted to the position of Principal at the Dacca College. He was serving as the Registrar of Deeds for Hooghly in 1843, and as Secretary of the Hooghly Branch of the Agricultural and Horticultural Society of India in 1843.

In 1846, Esdaile's work with pain-free surgery at Hoogly had come to the attention of the Deputy Governor of Bengal, Sir Herbert Maddocks. Maddocks appointed a committee of seven reputable (medical and non-medical) officials to investigate Esdaile's claims. They submitted a positive report (on 9 October 1846), and a small hospital in Calcutta was put at his disposal in November 1846.

By 1848, a mesmeric hospital supported entirely by public subscription was opened in Calcutta especially for Esdaile's work.

It was closed 18 months later by the Deputy Governor of Bengal, Sir John Littler: according to Cotton (1931, p. 170), although the Mott's Lane Mesmeric Hospital, which opened in 1846 and permanently closed in 1848, Elliotson "continued to practise mesmerism at the Sukeas' Street Dispensary until he left India in 1851".

In 1848, Lord Dalhousie, the Governor-General of India, appointed Esdaile to the position of Presidency Surgeon; and, in 1849—whilst not supporting the continuation of the mesmeric hospital in Calcutta—Dalhousie had so much respect for Esdaile and his work, that he appointed him to the position of Marine Surgeon (serving the Indian Navy) on 29 May 1849.

Esdaile retired from the British East India Company in 1853, on the expiration of his 20 years' contract.

== Esdaile and "pain-free" surgery ==
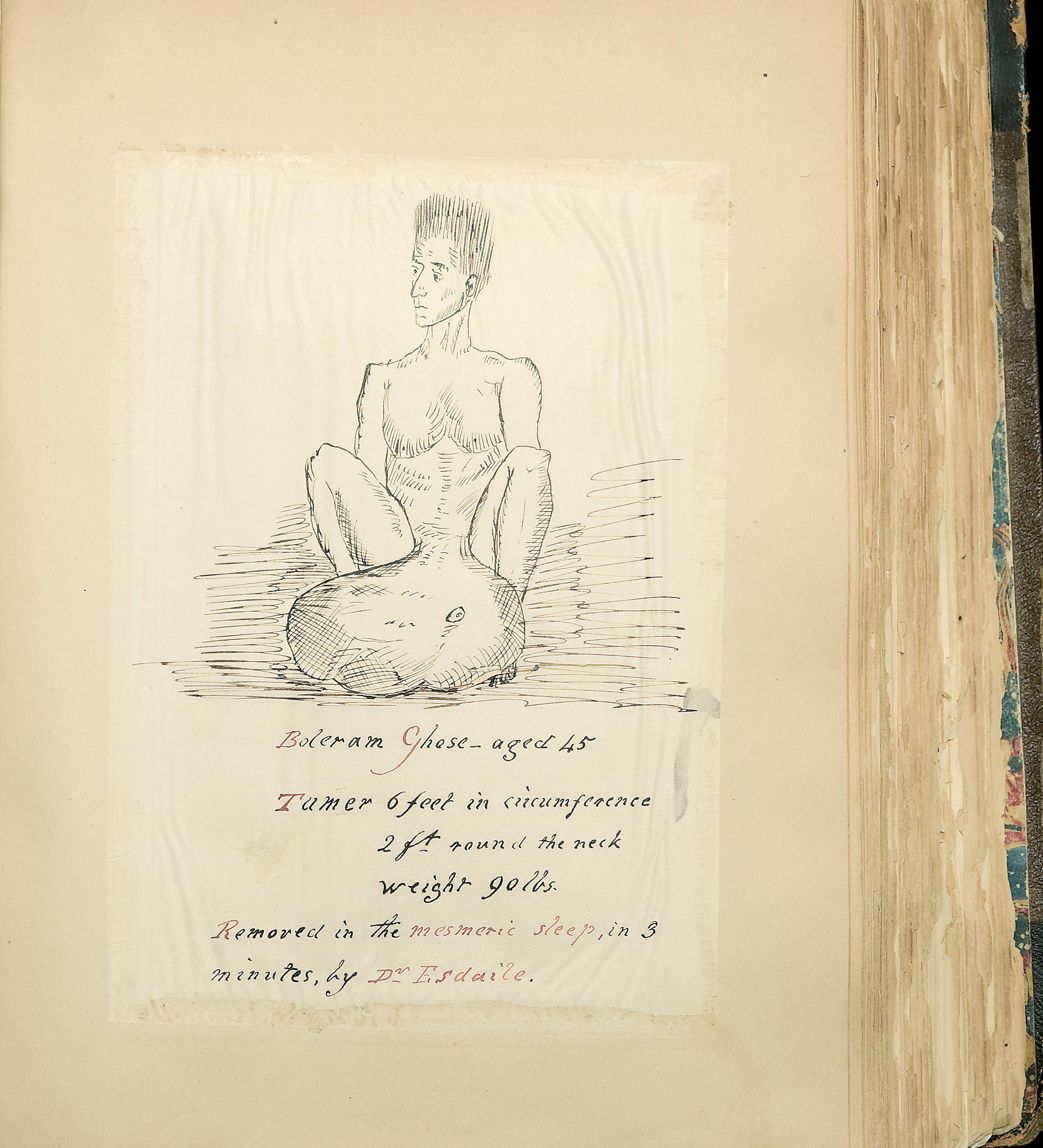
A 90lb hydrocele, 6ft in circumference, removed "painlessly" (under the influence of Jhar-Phoonk) by Esdaile in 3 minutes.

[Through my use of Jhar-Phoonk as both an anaesthetic and curative agent] I have introduced, and I hope may say established, a new and powerful means of alleviating human suffering among the natives of Bengal … [which has brought] painless surgical operations, and other medical advantages [to them]; of which I hope they will not be deprived. -- (Esdaile, 1846, pp.v, vii)
The de-stabilising impact upon the prevailing (UK) medico-surgical mind-set of the astonishing news of the nature and number of Esdaile’s successful ‘pain-free’ surgeries [in 1845] … and how the challenges that Esdaile’s "pain-free" procedures, mistakenly thought to be "mesmeric", presented to the conventional medicine of his day led to the hurried, widespread adoption of ether two years later are a significant part of the history of anaesthesia. –– (Yeates, 2018, p.122, emphasis added)
Unlike Braid, whose first [hypnotism-centred] interest was in hypnotism’s therapeutic applications (and only later in investigating its anaesthetic capacity), Esdaile’s first and only interest [with his Jhar-Phoonk-centred enterprise], as a compassionate man deeply interested in the relief of needless human misery, was the acquisition of a means through which the pain of his patients, surgical and otherwise, might be attenuated. –– (Yeates, 2018, p.124, emphasis added)

It is an objective matter of record that, over a six-year period (from April 1845 to June 1851), James Esdaile, an Edinburgh-trained Scottish surgeon employed by the East India Company—a colonial official employed as both "Civil Surgeon" to the East India Company’s Hooghly Imambara Hospital, and as the medical officer responsible for the hospital at Hooghly Gaol—performed 'pain-free' major surgery on more than 300 cases (amputations, removal of cataracts, removal of massive tumours, firstly at Hooghly, and, later at Calcutta.

It is also significant that "the [same] official records also reveal the entirely unanticipated consequence of Esdaile’s approach to the attenuation of (otherwise) excruciating pain: [namely,] the extraordinary reduction in the mortality rate of his "native" surgery patients from 50% to 5%, due to a significant reduction in post-operative shock" (Yeates, 2018, p.125).

== Indian subjects only ==
According to Winter (1998, p.197), who notes that "the persuasiveness of [Esdaile's] work actually relied upon the lowly status of his patients", Esdaile "thought nothing" of routinely subjecting his (from-the-prison) surgical patients -- "the great majority [of whom] were impoverished Indian subjects: peasants, sidar bearers, husbandmen, and cart drivers" (loc. cit) -- "to indignities and even tortures that were highly effective in validating [their freedom from pain] but that no high-caste Indian or member of the European community would tolerate" (loc.cit, emphasis added). According to Gauld (1992, p. 223),

"[By the time of his move from Hooghly to Calcutta in November 1846] it had become Esdaile’s practice to test the readiness of his patients for operation by dropping a hot coal on the inside of a leg, or by giving them the strongest electric shock which his machine could produce, or (most often) by powerfully squeezing their testicles. Only if the patient did not respond in any way did Esdaile feel able to proceed to surgery. Otherwise magnetization was continued."

== Esdaile's experiments with his own version of "mesmerism" ==
According to Esdaile's own account (1846b, pp. 40–59), he knew very little of "mesmerism"—having "never [seen] it practised", and only coming to know of it "from reading [about it in newspapers]" (p. 43)—and he only came to experiment with "mesmerism" entirely by "accident"; and, in relation to the widespread attribution of the characteristic mesmeric phenomena to "imitation", Esdaile would later stressed that this was impossible in this "accidental" case:

"There are some interesting particulars in this first successful mesmeric experiment in India, to which I beg leave to direct the reader’s attention.

I. The purely accidental and unpremeditated nature of the experiment.
II. All want of consent between the parties.
III. The operator’s want of belief in his own power; for I had never seen Mesmerism, and all I knew about it was from scraps in the newspapers.
IV. The absolute ignorance of the patient; it being impossible that he should ever have heard of Mesmerism.
V. The impossibility, therefore, of imitating the mesmeric phenomena.

Under all the circumstances of the case, collusion between the parties will not, I presume, be suspected: and every possible care was taken to exclude any source of fallacy in the experiment." -- (James Esdaile, 1846b, p.41)

Greatly distressed by the pain being experienced during a drainage procedure by one of his double-hydrocele patients from Hooghly Gaol, Esdaile decided, on the spur of the moment, to experiment with "mesmerism" (as Esdaile supposed that might be) as a means of reducing the man's excruciating misery.

This inmate—who "was the person destined to become my first mesmeric victim [was] none other than a Hindoo felon of the hangman caste, condemned to labour on the roads, in irons" (p. 40) -- was "mesmerised", by Esdaile, without any warning or explanation, on 4 April 1845. Esdaile "mesmerised" him on a number of occasions over the next seven days; and, although Esdaile was able to painlessly drain fluid from the hydroceles (without any awareness on the patient's part), Esdaile did not conduct any surgery.

Esdaile described the two-hour version of "mesmerization" that he used in his first experiments as follows:

"[Seated opposite the patient] I placed his knees between mine, and began to pass my hands slowly over his face, at the distance of an inch, and carried them down to the pit of his stomach. This was continued for half an hour … [as there seemed to be no change] the passes were continued for a quarter of an hour longer — still no sensible effect. Being now tired (thermometer 85°), I gave it up in despair, and declared it to be a failure. While I rested myself, the man remained quiet, and made fewer grimaces, and when ordered to open his eyes, he said there was a smoke in the room. This roused my attention, and tempted me to persevere. I now breathed on his head, and carried my hands from the back of his head over his face and down to the Epigastrium, where I pressed them united. The first time this was done, he took his hands off his groins and pressed them both firmly down upon mine …. The same process was persevered in, and in about an hour he began to gape, said he must sleep, that his senses were gone; and his replies became incoherent. … All appearance of pain now disappeared; his hands were crossed on his breast, instead of being pressed on the groins, and his countenance showed the most perfect repose." -- (Esdaile, 1846, pp.43-44)

== Jhar-Phoonk ==
Although his experiments with his own version of "mesmerism" had shown that "mesmeric analgesia" was entirely possible, it was obvious that his "mesmeric induction" with both patient and operator seated restricted its application to the attenuation of discomfort in seated patients undergoing a fluid-drainage procedure. Inspired by his experimental success, and aware of the need to have his surgical subjects lying on the operating table, he made the extraordinary decision, decided to experiment with the "native" procedure known as Jhar-Phoonk.

Jhar-Phoonk—a secular, "white magic", folk treatment procedure, derived from an Islamic exorcism ritual known as Ruqyah—was routinely performed upon poor, illiterate, impoverished Northern Indian rural workers by itinerant fakirs or dedicated practitioners (known as Jhar-Phoonk Walas) to alleviate distress, dispel illness and infirmity, and treat disease.

As performed by Esdaile—on semi-naked subjects, who had had their heads shaven—the procedure involved an intense combination of continuously stroking the subject (thus, jhar, "to sweep") and continuously breathing on them (thus, phoonk, "to blow away").

As performed by Esdaile, the procedure was exhausting:

The following is the routine observed in the six different hospitals in which I have practised [Jhar-Phoonk]; and if the plan has any advantage over the European method, I presume it is from the more intimate and extensive connection established between the two systems; the bodies of both parties being usually naked to the waist, is also of service, no doubt.
The patient is desired to lie down in bed in a darkened room, and go to sleep if he can; his head is brought to one end of the bed, and the [operator] seats himself so as to be able to breathe upon the head, and extend his hands readily to the pit of the stomach. He then begins making passes from the back of the head down to the pit of the stomach, breathing gently on the head and eyes also. The fingers are held loosely in the shape of claws, and are carried slowly over the parts, at the distance of an inch from the surface, dwelling longer over the eyes, nose, mouth, and sides of the neck; and on reaching the pit of the stomach, the hands are suspended there some minutes. Having continued this process for a quarter or half an hour, the passes may be advantageously ended by pressing both hands lightly on the pit of the stomach for some minutes. -- (Esdaile, 1852b, p.16)

As a consequence, Esdaile, whose own health was far from good, soon began to delegate this exhausting work—which, when necessary, would involve "[having] a patient magnetized for hours each day for ten or twelve days [to his] native assistants, saving his own strength for the performance of surgery"—and Esdaile himself spoke of how "it is exacting too much of human nature to expect people to sweat for hours pawing the air".

In a short time, Esdaile had gained a wide reputation for painless surgery, especially in cases of the scrotal "tumours" that were endemic in Bengal at that time due to filariasis (similar to elephantiasis) that was transmitted by mosquitoes. Esdaile's mesmeric anaesthesia was extremely safe:

"I beg, to state, for the satisfaction of those who have not yet a practical knowledge of the subject, that I have seen no bad consequences whatever arise from persons being operated on when in the mesmeric trance.
Cases have occurred in which no pain has been felt subsequent to the operation even; the wounds healing in a few days by the first intention; and in the rest, I have seen no indications of any injury being done to the constitution.
On the contrary, it appears to me to have been saved, and that less constitutional disturbance has followed than under ordinary circumstances.
There has not been a death among the cases operated on." -- (James Esdaile, 1846b, p.xxiv)

However, despite his successes with anaesthesia and his impressive surgical outcomes (exclusively with "native" patients), Esdaile was at a loss to explain these events in the light of his earlier (pre-mesmeric) six years' experience:

"Since [my first use of Jhar-Phonk in April 1845,] I have had every month more operations of this kind than take place in the native hospital in Calcutta in a year, and more than I had for the six years previous.
There must be some reason for this, and I only see two ways of accounting for it: my patients, on returning home, either say to their friends similarly afflicted, "Wah! brother, what a soft man the doctor Sahib is! He cut me to pieces for twenty minutes, and I made him believe that I did not feel it. Isn't it a capital joke? Do go and play him the same trick; you have only to laugh in your elbow, and you will not feel the pain."
Or they say to their brother sufferers, — " Look at me; I have got rid of my burthen, (of 20, 30, 40, 50, 60, or 80 lbs., as it may be,) am restored to the use of my body, and can again work for my bread: this, I assure you, the doctor Sahib did when I was asleep, and I knew nothing about it;—you will be equally lucky, I dare say; and I advise you to go and try; you need not be cut if you feel it."
Which of these hypotheses best explains the fact my readers will decide for themselves.
It ought to be added, that most of these persons were not paupers, but people in comfortable circumstances, whom no inducement short of painless operations could tempt to enter a charity, or any other hospital; and all who know the natives are aware of this." -- (James Esdaile, 1846b, pp.218–219)

According to James Braid, who had, himself, performed the first hypnotism-assisted 'pain-free' surgery several years earlier (in Manchester, in January 1842), Esdaile "believe[d] in the transmission of some peculiar occult influence from the operator to the patient, as the cause of the subsequent phenomena" (Braid, 1847, p. 10). And, according to Esdaile, "the [operator] can not only saturate the system of the patient, generally, with his own nervous fluid; but, when his patient becomes very considerably under his influence, can induce local determinations of the nervous energy to various parts, so as to place them, for a time, beyond the patient's volition, even while he retains his general consciousness" (Esdaile, 1852a, p. 237).

== Mistaken identification of Esdaile’s Jhar-Phoonk with d’Eslon’s magnetization-by-contact ==
The entirely mistaken, generally held, and widely published view that (the otherwise highly significant) Esdaile used "mesmerism" to produce the pain-free condition under which he conducted completely pain-free surgery, not only significantly muddies the already far-from-clear waters in relation to the historical (in)accuracy of the modern accounts of the history of mesmerism, anaesthesia, and hypnotism, but is so far from the objective historical truth that, to use Wolfgang Pauli’s expression, "[it] is not only not right, it is not even wrong".

The mistake has its origins in the activities of a rather wide range of geographically isolated Eurocentric advocates and promoters of "mesmerism" (i.e., rather than "animal magnetism") -- such as, for example, John Elliotson with his journal, The Zoist: A Journal of Cerebral Physiology & Mesmerism, and Their Applications to Human Welfare, George Sandby, with his Mesmerism and its Opponents (1848), etc. – and their eagerness to shelter all sorts of endeavours, and all sorts of practices, beneath the capacious umbrella term "mesmerism".

Having noticed a vague, superficial similarity between Esdaile’s (Islamic/exorcism derived) Jhar-Phoonk procedures and the (secular/healing derived) "magnetization-by-contact" procedures of Charles-Nicholas d’Eslon (1750-1786)—as represented in the Reports of the two (1784) French Royal Commissions on "Animal Magnetism"—they had, to use a biological analogy, mistakenly identified what is a clear case of "homoplasy" (i.e., similar entities that have descended from an entirely separate lineage) as a case of "homology" (i.e., similar entities that have descended from a common ancestor).

However, as Yeates (2018, pp. 128–129) observes, when viewed from a 19th-century Eurocentric perspective—and, especially, given the physical invasive nature of, say, the surgeon's scalpel, the apothecary's mixture, the herbalist's decoction, the barber-surgeon's blood-letting, and the physician's emetics and purgatives—it is easy to see how "mesmerism à la d'Eslon" could have been considered, by contrast, to be some sort of 'energy field manipulation' (in accord with some as-yet-to-be-discovered "law of nature"); and, given that perspective (and despite the absence of d'Eslon's implements and apparatus), it could be said that, when viewed from a sufficiently abstract "level of analysis", Esdaile's Jhar-Phoonk—despite its non-"mesmeric" roots—also involved some sort of analogous process of manipulating an 'energy field'. From this, Yeates argues, it seems clear that the erroneous view that Esdaile's Jhar-Phoonk was "mesmerism" (inevitably) came from two simple mistakes:

- (1) Equivocation (i.e., where two different referents are given the same name): The term "mesmerism" was being (ambiguously) used to denote both the super-ordinate class and its (European) sub-division.
- The wrong referent (due to excessive exactness): Although the term "mesmerism" could have been loosely applied to Esdaile’s Jhar-Phoonk in the vaguest sort of a way—on the grounds that, when viewed as an 'energy field manipulation', and when compared with, say, a physician's application of leeches, Jhar-Phoonk certainly seemed to be a sort-of-kind-of-mesmeric-process—the supposedly vague term was being universally (mis)interpreted in the narrowest and most restricted way.

=== The importance of Esdaile’s use of Jhar-Phoonk ===
The fact that the (mistaken) modern accounts of the history of mesmerism, anaesthesia, and hypnotism constantly assert that Esdaile employed "mesmeric anaesthesia" for his pain-free surgeries are entirely without foundation does nothing to diminish the watershed significance of the extraordinary impact that Esdaile's well-documented capacity to produce complete anaesthesia in some of his surgical cases had upon the disciplinary consciousness of the medical profession.

Moreover, in clearly presenting so many well-documented cases of what he termed the "inducement of coma for surgical purposes" (Esdaile 1846b, p. 27), Esdaile prepared the way for the disciplinary acceptance of the use of "inhalation ether" when it was introduced into the U.K. 18 months later, in December 1846.

The very prospect of anaesthesia, mesmeric or otherwise, was extremely controversial; with many influential disciplinary figures, such as the eminent French surgeon Alfred Velpeau, opposed to it -- declaring, in 1839, that, not only was the thought of pain-free surgery a fantasy, but that pain and surgery were inseparable, and that the experience of pain was an essential part of any cure.
… [However,] in 1847, having directly verified the anaesthetic effects of ether and, from that, having satisfied himself that easily reproduceable pain-free surgery per medium of the ‘scientific’ administration of an inhaled chemical substance was now an objective reality -- and, thus, entirely distinct from the questionable, hard to replicate, and ‘unscientific’ practices of the magnetists -- Velpeau predicted that "surgery will obtain benefits of great value from inhaled ether, from the point of view of the art itself as well as from a purely humanitarian perspective". -- (Yeates, 2018, pp.114-115)

== Mistaken identification of Esdaile’s Jhar-Phoonk with Braid's "hypnotism" and/or Bernheim's "hypnosis" ==
In addition to the mistaken identification of Esdaile's Jhar-Phoonk with "mesmerism", there is also the problem of (otherwise reliable) sources asserting that Esdaile used "hypnotism": for example, George Bankoff in his infliuential work on the history of anaesthesia, The Conquest of Pain (1946), not only claimed (pp. 74–75) that the "mesmeric" pain-free operations performed by Joseph Récamier, in 1821, and by Jules Germain Cloquet, in 1829, had been conducted with "hypnotism", and not only that John Elliotson exclusively used "hypnotism", but also, that Esdaile's Jhar-Phoonk was, in fact, "hypnotism" under another name.

Not only is there no connection between Esdaile's "Jhar-Phoonk" and either James Braid's "hypnotism" or Hippolyte Bernheim's ("dormez, dormez, dormez") "hypnosis", it is also a matter of historical fact that Braid was using "hypnotism" for pain-free surgery as early as January 1842, more than three years earlier than Esdaile's first experiments.

James Braid (1852) on Esdaile's 'pain-free' surgery -- includes extract of Esdaile letter

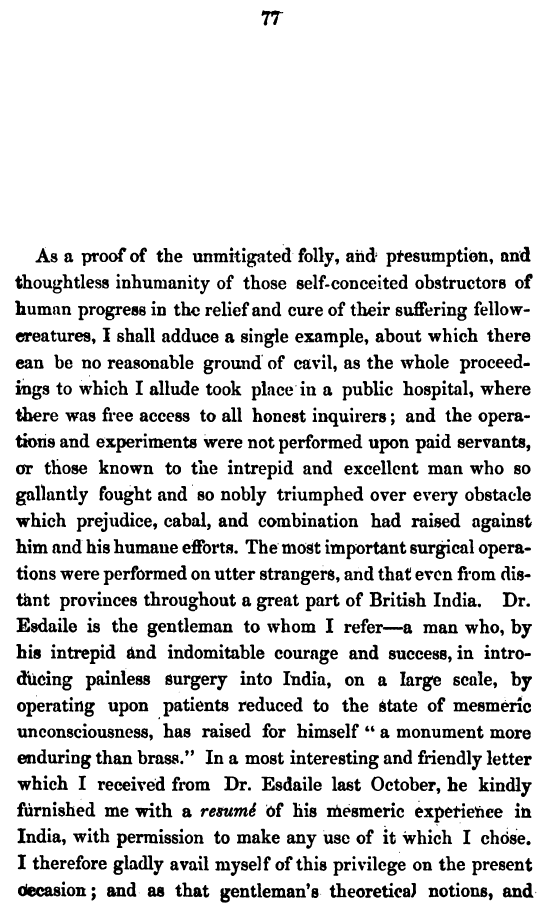
(page 77)

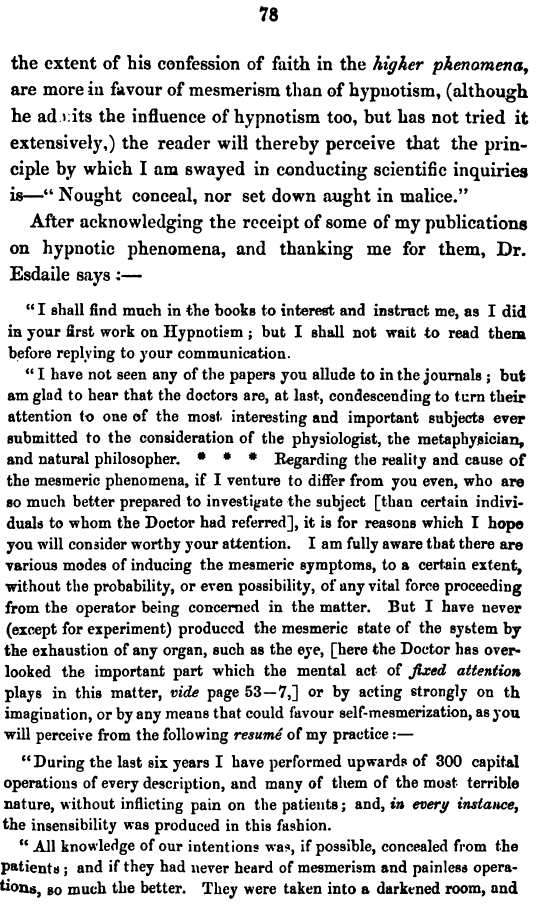
(page 78)

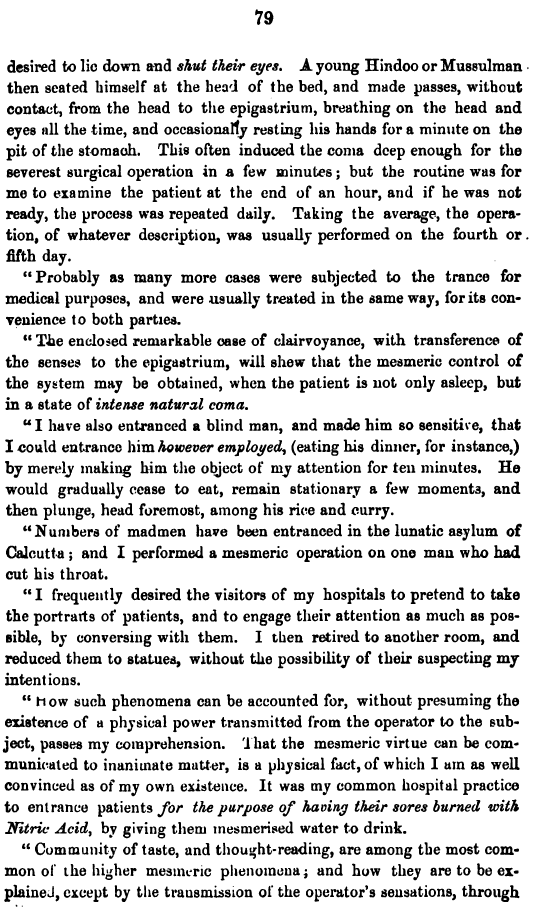
(page 79)

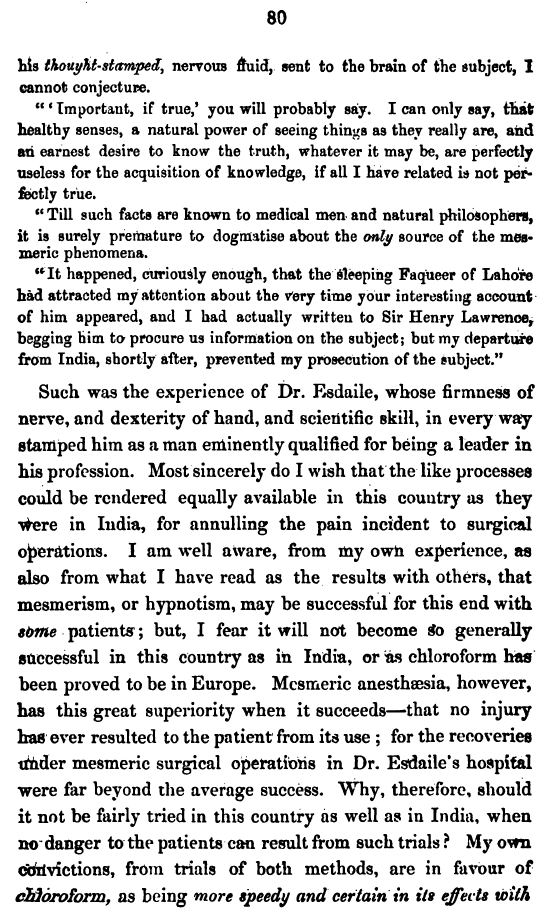
(page 80)

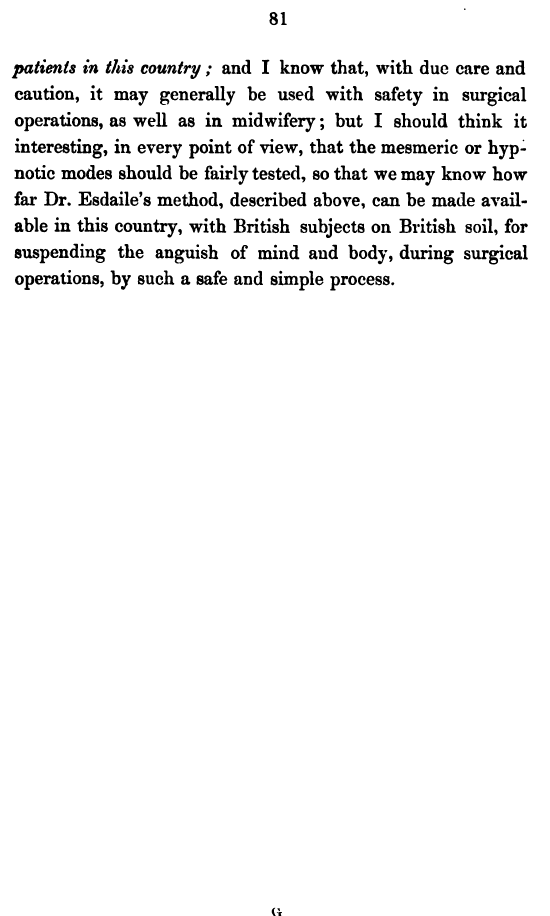
(page 81)

== The artificial propagation of salmon ==
Esdaile was a keen salmon fisherman, and it was "at [his] instigation that the proprietors of salmon-fishings on the Tay constructed the artificial breeding beds at Stormontfield" (Esdaile, 1857), when a letter, written by Esdaile, on the artificial propagation of salmon, "A Plan for Replenishing the River Tay with Salmon", was submitted to a meeting of the proprietors on the Tay on 19 July 1852.

== Death ==
Having retired from the British East India Company in 1853, Esdaile became a Vic-President of the London Mesmeric Infirmary, and a Vice-President of the Scottish Curative Mesmeric Association ().

After briefly returning to Perth in Scotland he settled in Sydenham where he died on 10 January 1859. He is buried at West Norwood Cemetery.

== See also ==
- James Esdaile (minister)
- History of general anesthesia
- The Zoist: A Journal of Cerebral Physiology & Mesmerism, and Their Applications to Human Welfare
