= James Braid (surgeon) =

Scottish surgeon (1795–1860), pioneer of hypnotism

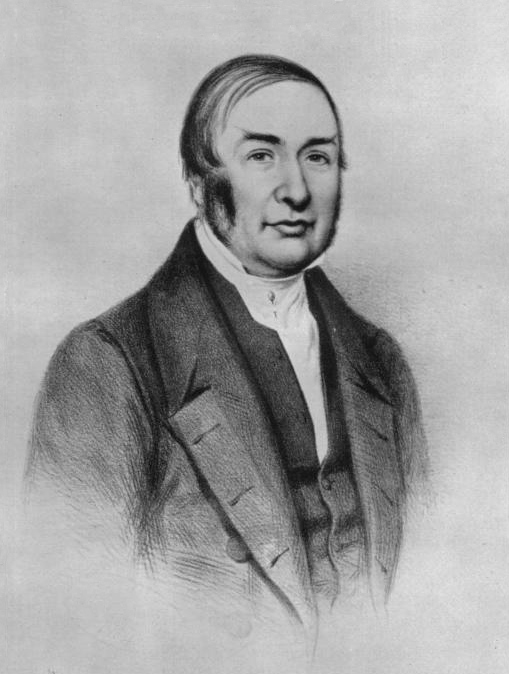
- Braid in 1854
- Born: 19 June 1795; Portmoak, Kinross-shire, Scotland
- Died: 25 March 1860 (aged 64); Chorlton-on-Medlock, Manchester, England
- Education: University of Edinburgh
- Known for: Surgery; hypnotism
- Scientific career
- Fields: Medicine; natural history
- Workplaces: Royal College of Surgeons of Edinburgh; Wernerian Natural History Society

James Braid (19 June 1795 – 25 March 1860) was a Scottish surgeon, natural philosopher, and "gentleman scientist". He was a significant innovator in the treatment of clubfoot, spinal curvature, knock-knees, bandy legs, and squint; a significant pioneer of hypnotism and hypnotherapy, and an important and influential pioneer in the adoption of both hypnotic anaesthesia and chemical anaesthesia.

He is regarded by some, such as William S. Kroger (2008, p. 3), as the "Father of Modern Hypnotism". However, in relation to the issue of there being significant connections between Braid's "hypnotism" and "modern hypnotism" (as it is practised), let alone "identity" between the two, André Muller Weitzenhoffer (2000) urges the utmost caution in making any such assumption:

"It has been a basic assumption of modern (i.e., twentieth century) hypnotism that it is founded on the same phenomenology it historically evolved from. Such differences as exist between older versions of hypnotism and newer ones being reduced largely to a matter of interpretation of the facts. That there are common elements is not in question, but that there is full identity in questionable and basically untestable." – André Muller Weitzenhoffer (p. 3; emphasis added).

Also, in relation to the clinical application of "hypnotism",

Although Braid believed that hypnotic suggestion was a valuable remedy in functional nervous disorders, he did not regard it as a rival to other forms of treatment, nor wish in any way to separate its practice from that of medicine in general. He held that whoever talked of a "universal remedy" was either a fool or a knave: similar diseases often arose from opposite pathological conditions, and the treatment ought to be varied accordingly. – John Milne Bramwell (1910)

== Early life ==
Braid was born on 19 June 1795, the third son, and the seventh and youngest child, of James Braid (c. 1761–1840s) and Anne Suttie (c. 1761–?). He was born at Ryelaw House, in the Parish of Portmoak, Kinross, Scotland on 19 June 1795.

On 17 November 1813, at the age of 18, Braid married Margaret Mason (1792–1869), aged 21, the daughter of Robert Mason (?–1813) and Helen Mason, née Smith. They had two children, both of whom were born at Leadhills in Lanarkshire: Anne Daniel, née Braid (1820–1881), and James Braid (1822–1882).

== Education ==
Braid was apprenticed to the Leith surgeons Thomas Anderson and Charles Anderson (i.e., both father and son). As part of that apprenticeship, Braid also attended the University of Edinburgh from 1812 to 1814, where he was also influenced by Thomas Brown, M.D. (1778–1820), who held the chair of Moral Philosophy at Edinburgh from 1808 to 1820.

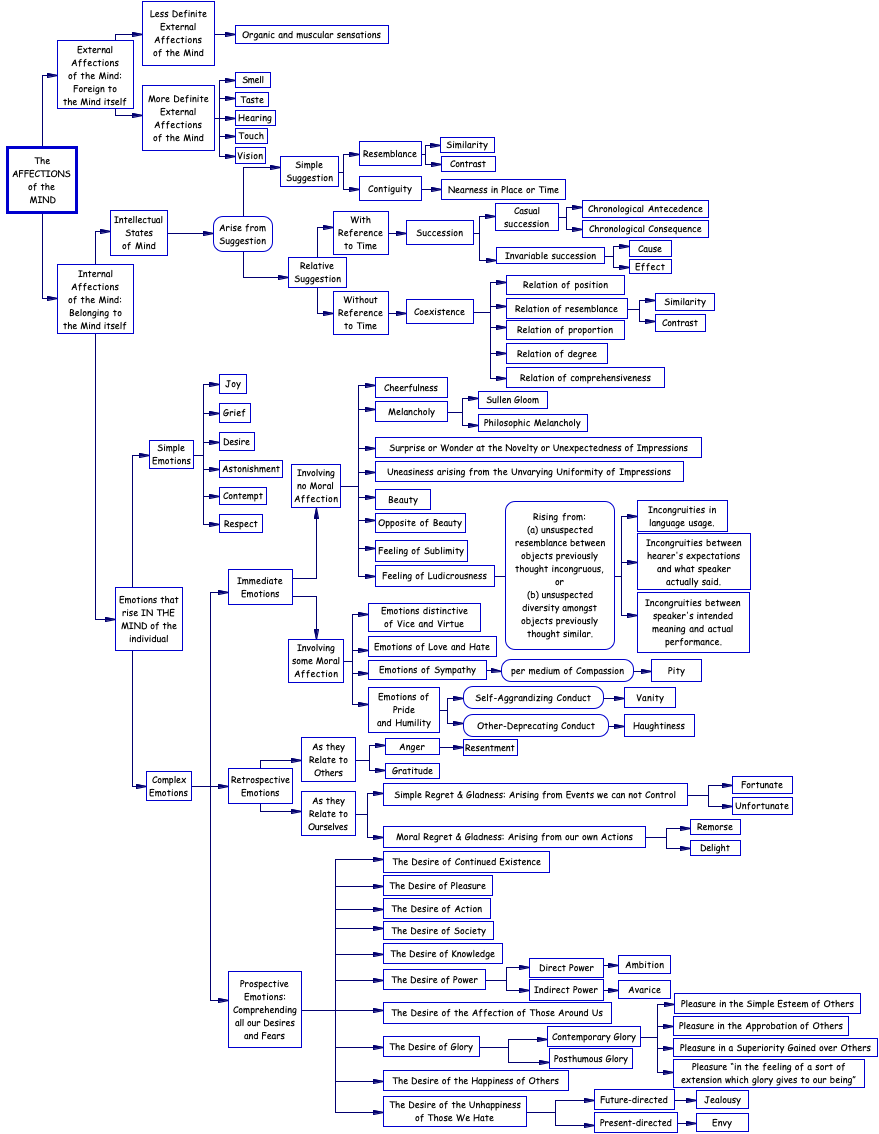
Brown's "Affections of the Mind", as discussed in his Lectures on the Philosophy of the Human Mind (Yeates, 2005, p.119).

Braid obtained the diploma of the Licentiate of the Royal College of Surgeons of the City of Edinburgh, the Lic.R.C.S. (Edin), in 1815, which entitled him to refer to himself as a member of the college, rather than a fellow.

== Surgeon ==
Braid was appointed surgeon to Lord Hopetoun's mines at Leadhills, Lanarkshire, in 1816. In 1825, he set up in private practice at Dumfries, where he also "encountered the exceptional surgeon, William Maxwell, MD (1760–1834)".

One of his Dumfries' patients, Alexander Petty (1778–1864), a Scot, employed as a traveller for Scarr, Petty and Swain, a firm of Manchester tailors, invited Braid to move his practice to Manchester, England. Braid moved to Manchester in 1828, continuing to practise from there until his death in 1860.

"Though he was best known in the medical world for his theory and practice of hypnotism, he had also obtained wonderfully successful results by operation in cases of club foot and other deformities, which brought him patients from every part of the kingdom. Up to 1841 [viz., when he first encountered hypnotism] he had operated on 262 cases of talipes, 700 cases of strabismus, and 23 cases of spinal curvature." — John Milne Bramwell (1896).

== Learned Society and Technical Institute Affiliations ==
Braid was a member of a number of prestigious "learned societies" and technical/educational institutions: a member of both the Royal College of Surgeons of Edinburgh and the Provincial Medical and Surgical Association, a Corresponding Member of both the Wernerian Natural History Society of Edinburgh (in 1824), and the Royal Medical Society of Edinburgh (in 1854), a Member of the Manchester Athenæum, and the Honorary Curator of the museum of the Manchester Natural History Society.

== Mesmerism ==
James Braid, gentleman scientist.

The first who investigated the matter [of mesmerism] in a scientific way, and who deserves more honour than he has yet received, was … James Braid, a Manchester surgeon. At first a sceptic, holding that the whole of the so-called magnetic phenomena were the results of illusion, delusion, or excited imagination, he found in 1841 that one, at least, of the characteristic symptoms could not be accounted for in this manner: viz., the fact that many of the mesmerized individuals are quite unable to open their eyes.
Braid was much puzzled by this discovery, until he found that the "magnetic trance" could be induced, with many of its marvellous symptoms of catalepsy, aphasia, exaltation and depression of the sensory functions, by merely concentrating the patient’s attention on one object or one idea, and preventing all interruption or distraction whatever.
But in the state thus produced, none of the so-called higher phenomena of the mesmerists, such as the reading of sealed and hidden letters, the contents of which were unknown to the mesmerised person, could ever be brought about.
To the well defined assemblage of symptoms which Braid observed in patients who had steadily gazed for eight or twelve minutes with attention concentrated upon a small bright object, and which were different from those of the so-called magnetic trance, Braid gave the name of Hypnotism …
W. T. Preyer (1880: address to British Medical Association's Annual Meeting).

Braid first observed the operation of animal magnetism, when he attended a public performance by the travelling French magnetic demonstrator Charles Lafontaine (1803–1892) at the Manchester Athenæum on 13 November 1841.

In Neurypnology (1843, pp. 34–35) he states that, prior to his encounter with Lafontaine, he had already been totally convinced by a four-part investigation of Animal Magnetism published in The London Medical Gazette (i.e., Anon, 1838) that there was no evidence of the existence of any magnetic agency for any such phenomena. The final article's last paragraph read:

This, then, [in conclusion,] is our case. Every credible effect of magnetism has occurred, and every incredible is said to have occurred, in cases where no magnetic influence has been exerted, but in all which, excited imagination, irritation, or some powerful mental impression, has operated: where the mind has been alone acted on, magnetic effects have been produced without magnetic manipulations: where magnetic manipulations have been employed, unknown, and therefore without the assistance of the mind, no result has ever been produced. Why, then, imagine a new agent, which cannot act by itself, and which has never yet even seemed to produce a new phenomenon?

And, along with the strong impression made upon Braid by the Medical Gazette's article, there was also the more recent impressions made by Thomas Wakley's exposure of the comprehensive fraud of John Elliotson's subjects, the Okey sisters,

[all of which] determined me to consider the whole as a system of collusion or illusion, or of excited imagination, sympathy, or imitation. I therefore abandoned the subject as unworthy of farther investigation, until I attended the conversazioni of Lafontaine, where I saw one fact, the inability of a patient to open his eyelids, which arrested my attention; I felt convinced it was not to be attributed to any of the causes referred to, and I therefore instituted experiments to determine the question; and exhibited the results to the public in a few days after. – (Braid, Neurypnology (1843), p. 35; emphasis added).

Braid always maintained that he had gone to Lafontaine's demonstration as an open-minded sceptic, eager to examine the presented evidence at first hand – that is, rather than "entirely [depending] on reading or hearsay evidence for his knowledge of it" – and, then, from that evidence, form a considered opinion of Lafontaine's work. He was neither a closed-minded cynic intent on destroying Lafontaine, nor a deluded and naïvely credulous believer seeking authorization of his already formed belief.

Braid was amongst the medical men who were invited onto the platform by Lafontaine. Braid examined the physical condition of Lafontaine's magnetised subjects (especially their eyes and their eyelids) and concluded that they were, indeed, in quite a different physical state. Braid always stressed the significance of attending Lafontaine's conversazione.

== Hypnotism ==
"Modern hypnotism owes its name and its appearance in the realm of science to the investigations made by Braid. He is its true creator; he made it what it is; and above all, he gave emphasis to the experimental truth by means of which he proved that, when hypnotic phenomena are called into play, they are wholly independent of any supposed influence of the hypnotist upon the hypnotised, and that the hypnotised person simply reacts upon himself by reason of latent capacities in him which are artificially developed. Braid demonstrated that … hypnotism, acting upon a human subject as upon a fallow field, merely set in motion a string of silent faculties which only needed its assistance to reach their development. — Jules Bernard Luys (1828–1897)

=== Lafontaine ===
Braid attended two more of Lafontaine's demonstrations; and, by the third demonstration (on Saturday 20 November 1841), Braid was convinced of the veracity of some of Lafontaine's effects and phenomena (see Yeates, 2018b, pp. 56–63).

Lafontaine’s technique was a combination of physical contact, mesmeric passes, and eye-fixation. It began with operator and subject facing each other. The operator held the subject’s thumbs. Lafontaine stressed the importance of the initial physical contact, and the subsequent operator-imposition of 'mind control' once 'rapport' had been established. Although generally successful with his assistants, he was rarely successful with volunteers (only successful in "one in four or five cases"); and was, very often, forced to abandon his attempts after some 30 minutes or so of intense effort. – Yeates (2018b), p. 57.

In particular, whilst Braid was entirely convinced that a transformation from, so to speak, condition_{1} to condition_{2}, and back to condition_{1} had really taken place, he was also entirely convinced that no magnetic agency of any sort (as Lafontaine emphatically claimed) was responsible for the (veridical) events he had witnessed at first hand. He also rejected outright the assertion that the transformation in question had "proceeded from, or [had been] excited into action by another [person]" (Neurypnology, p. 32).

=== Braid's experimentum crucis ===
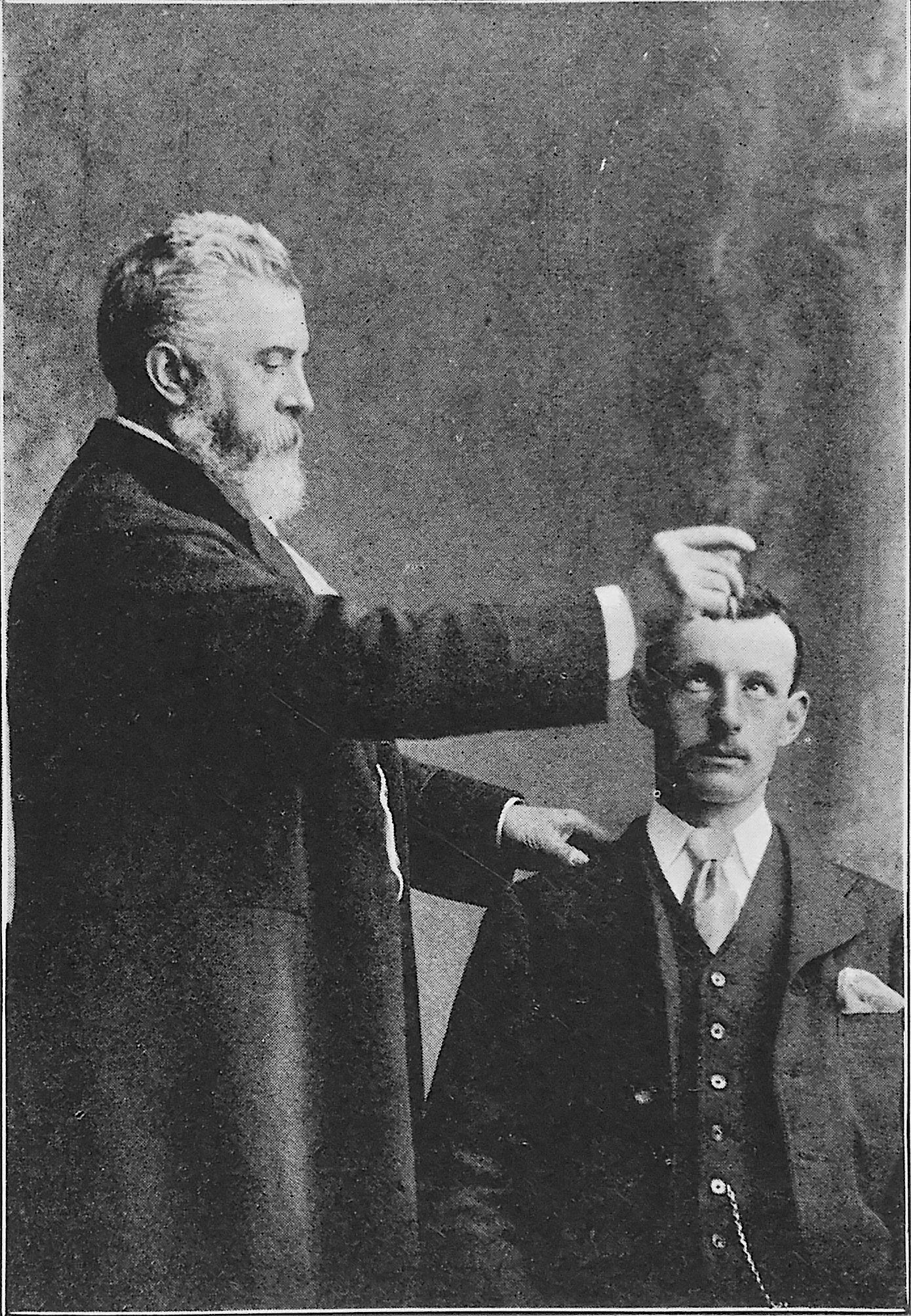
Braid's "upwards and inwards squint" induction method, as demonstrated by James Coates (1843–1933) in 1904.

Braid then performed his own experimentum crucis. Operating on the principle of Occam's Razor (that 'entities ought not to be multiplied beyond necessity'), and recognising that he could diminish, rather than multiply entities, he made an extraordinary decision to perform a role-reversal and treat the operator-subject interaction as subject-internal, operator-guided procedure; rather than, as Lafontaine supposed, an operator-centred, subject-external procedure. Braid emphatically proved his point by his self-experimentation with his "upwards and inwards squint".

The exceptional success of Braid's use of 'self-' or 'auto-hypnotism' (rather than 'hetero-hypnotism'), entirely by himself, on himself, and within his own home, clearly demonstrated that it had nothing whatsoever to do with the 'gaze', 'charisma', or 'magnetism' of the operator; all it needed was a subject's 'fixity of vision' on an 'object of concentration' at such a height and such a distance from the bridge of their nose that the desired 'upwards and inwards squint' was achieved. And, at the same time, by using himself as a subject, Braid also conclusively proved that none of Lafontaine's phenomena were due to magnetic agency.

=== "Auto-hypnotization" and "hetero-hypnotization" ===
Braid conducted a number of experiments with self-hypnotization upon himself, and, by now convinced that he had discovered the natural psycho-physiological mechanism underlying these quite genuine effects, he performed his first act of hetero-hypnotization at his own residence, before several witnesses, including Captain Thomas Brown (1785–1862) on Monday 22 November 1841 – his first hypnotic subject was Mr. J. A. Walker. (see Neurypnology, pp. 16–20.)

=== Absence of physical contact ===
The following Saturday, (27 November 1841) Braid delivered his first public lecture at the Manchester Athenæum, in which, amongst other things, he was able to demonstrate that he could replicate the effects produced by Lafontaine, without the need for any sort of physical contact between the operator and the subject.

== Hugh M'Neile's "Satanic Agency and Mesmerism" sermon ==
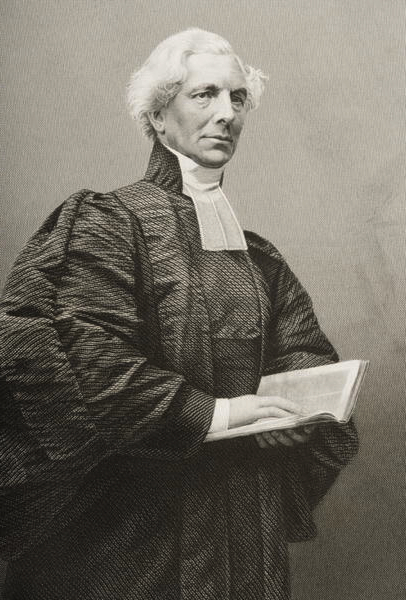
Hugh Boyd M'Neile

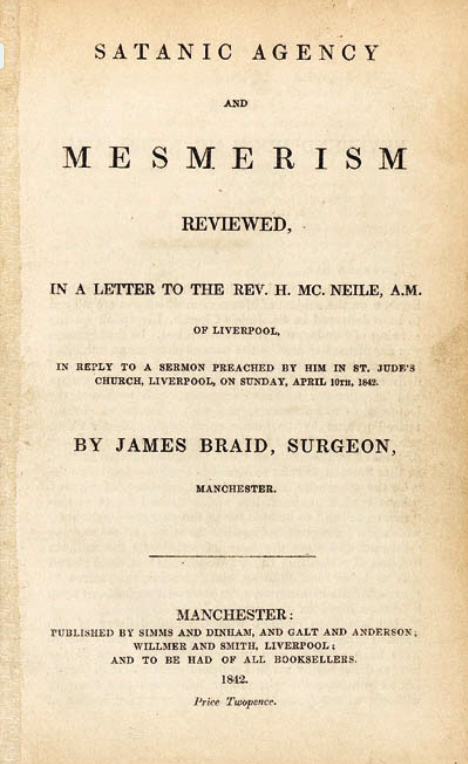
Braid's Satanic Agency and Mesmerism Reviewed (1842)

On the evening of Sunday, 10 April 1842, at St Jude's Church, Liverpool, the controversial cleric Hugh Boyd M'Neile preached a sermon against Mesmerism for more than ninety minutes to a capacity congregation; and, according to most critics, it was a poorly argued and unimpressive performance.

M'Neile's core argument was that scripture asserts the existence of "satanic agency"; and, in the process of delivering his sermon, he provided examples of the various instantiations that "satanic agency" might manifest (observing times, divination, necromancy, etc.), and claimed that these were all forms of "witchcraft"; and, further, he asserted that, because scripture asserts that, as "latter times" approach, more and more evidence of "satanic agency" will appear, it was, M'Neile asserted, ipso facto, transparently obvious that the exhibitions of Lafontaine and Braid, in Liverpool, at that very moment, were concrete examples of those particular instantiations.

He then moved into a confusing admixture of philippic (against Braid and Lafontaine), and polemic (against animal magnetism), wherein he concluded that all mesmeric phenomena were due to "satanic agency". In particular, he attacked Braid as a man, a scientist, a philosopher, and a medical professional. He claimed that Braid and Lafontaine were one and the same kind. He also threatened Braid's professional and social position by associating him with Satan; and, in the most ill-informed way, condemned Braid's important therapeutic work as having no clinical efficacy whatsoever.

The sermon was reported on at some length in the Liverpool Standard, two days later. Once Braid became fully aware of the newspaper reports of the conglomeration of matters that were reportedly raised in M'Neile's sermon, and the misrepresentations and outright errors of fact that it allegedly contained, as well as the vicious nature of the insults, and the implicit and explicit threats which were levelled against Braid's own personal, spiritual, and professional well-being by M'Neile, he sent a detailed private letter to M'Neile accompanied by a newspaper account of a lecture he had delivered on the preceding Wednesday evening (13 April) at Macclesfield, and a cordial invitation (plus a free admission ticket) for M'Neile to attend Braid's Liverpool lecture, on Thursday, 21 April.

Yet, despite Braid's courtesy, in raising his deeply felt concerns directly to M'Neile, in private correspondence, M'Neile did not acknowledge Braid's letter nor did he attend Braid's lecture. Further, in the face of all the evidence Braid had presented, and seemingly, without the slightest correction of its original contents, M'Neile allowed the entire text of his original sermon, as it had been transcribed by a stenographer (more than 7,500 words), to be published on Wednesday, 4 May 1842. It was this 'most ungentlemanly' act of M'Neile towards Braid, that forced Braid to publish his own response as a pamphlet; which he did on Saturday, 4 June 1842; a pamphlet which, in Crabtree's opinion is "a work of the greatest significance in the history of hypnotism, and of utmost rarity" (1988, p. 121).

== British Association for the Advancement of Science ==
Soon after, he wrote a report entitled "Practical Essay on the Curative Agency of Neuro-Hypnotism", which he applied to have read before the British Association for the Advancement of Science in June 1842. Despite being initially accepted for presentation, the paper was controversially rejected at the last moment; but Braid arranged for a series of Conversaziones at which he presented its contents. Braid summarised and contrasted his own view with the other views prevailing at that time:

"The various theories at present entertained regarding the phenomena of mesmerism may be arranged thus: First, those who believe them to be owing entirely to a system of collusion and delusion; and a great majority of society may be ranked under this head. Second, those who believe them to be real phenomena, but produced solely by imagination, sympathy, and imitation. Third, the animal magnetists, or those who believe in some magnetic medium set in motion as the exciting cause of the mesmeric phenomena. Fourth, those who have adopted my views, that the phenomena are solely attributable to a peculiar physiological state of the brain and the spinal cord."

== Terminology ==
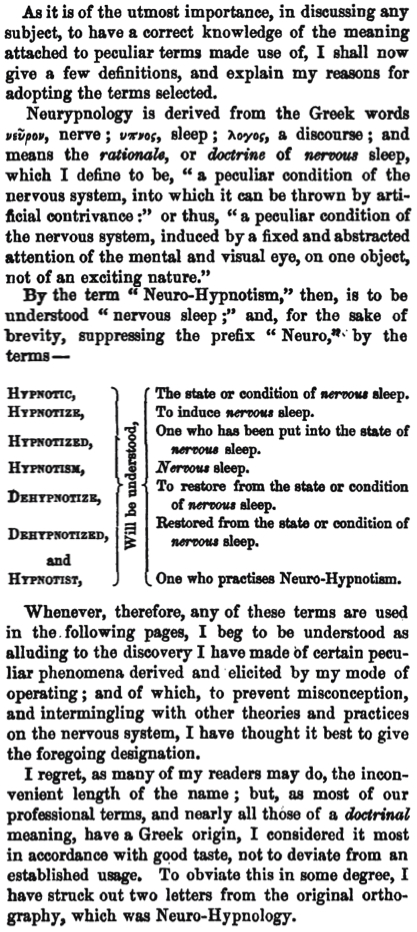
Braid's initial set of precise technical terms: Neurypnology (1843), pp. 12–13.

By at least 28 February 1842, Braid was using "Neurohypnology" (which he later shortened to "Neurypnology"); and, in a public lecture on Saturday, 12 March 1842, at the Manchester Athenæum, Braid explained his terminological developments as follows:

I therefore think it desirable to assume another name [than animal magnetism] for the phenomena, and have adopted neurohypnology – a word which will at once convey to every one at all acquainted with Greek, that it is the rationale or doctrine of nervous sleep; sleep being the most constant attendant and natural analogy to the primary phenomena of mesmerism; the prefix "nervous" distinguishing it from natural sleep. There are only two other words I propose by way of innovation, and those are hypnotism for magnetism and mesmerism, and hypnotised for magnetised and mesmerised.

It is important to recognize three things; namely, that:

(1) Braid was only using the term "sleep" metaphorically;
(2) despite the constant mistaken assertions in the modern literature, Braid did not, even on a single occasion, ever use the term hypnosis; and
(3) the term 'hypnosis' comes from the work of the Nancy School in the 1880s.

Although Braid was the first to use the terms hypnotism, hypnotise and hypnotist in English, the cognate terms hypnotique, hypnotisme, hypnotiste had been intentionally used by the French magnetist Baron Etienne Félix d'Henin de Cuvillers (1755–1841) at least as early as 1820. Braid, moreover, was the first person to use "hypnotism" in its modern sense, referring to a "psycho-physiological" theory rather than the "occult" theories of the magnetists.

In a letter written to the editor of The Lancet in 1845, Braid emphatically states that:

"I adopted the term "hypnotism" to prevent my being confounded with those who entertain those extreme notions [sc. that a mesmeriser's will has an "irresistible power… over his subjects" and that clairvoyance and other "higher phenomena" are routinely manifested by those in the mesmeric state], as well as to get rid of the erroneous theory about a magnetic fluid, or exoteric influence of any description being the cause of the sleep. I distinctly avowed that hypnotism laid no claim to produce any phenomena which were not "quite reconcilable with well-established physiological and psychological principles"; pointed out the various sources of fallacy which might have misled the mesmerists; [and] was the first to give a public explanation of the trick [by which a fraudulent subject had been able to deceive his mesmeriser]…
[Further, I have never been] a supporter of the imagination theory – i.e., that the induction of [hypnosis] in the first instance is merely the result of imagination. My belief is quite the contrary. I attribute it to the induction of a habit of intense abstraction, or concentration of attention, and maintain that it is most readily induced by causing the patient to fix his thoughts and sight on an object, and suppress his respiration."

== Induction ==
In his first publication (i.e., Satanic Agency and Mesmerism Reviewed, etc.), he had also stressed the importance of the subject concentrating both vision and thought, referring to "the continued fixation of the mental and visual eye"

The concept of the mind's eye first appeared in English in Chaucer's Man of Law's Tale in his Canterbury Tales, where he speaks of a man "who was blind, and could only see with the eyes of his mind, with which all men see after they go blind". as a means of engaging a natural physiological mechanism that was already hard-wired into each human being:

"I shall merely add, that my experiments go to prove that it is a law in the animal economy that, by the continued fixation of the mental and visual eye on any object in itself not of an exciting nature, with absolute repose of body and general quietude, they become wearied; and, provided the patients rather favour than resist the feeling of stupor which they feel creeping over them during such experiment, a state of somnolency is induced, and that peculiar state of brain, and mobility of the nervous system, which render the patient liable to be directed so as to manifest the mesmeric phenomena. I consider it not so much the optic, as the motor and sympathetic nerves, and the mind, through which the impression is made. Such is the position I assume; and I feel so thoroughly convinced that it is a law of the animal economy, that such effects should follow such condition of mind and body, that I fear not to state, as my deliberate opinion, that this is a fact which cannot be controverted."

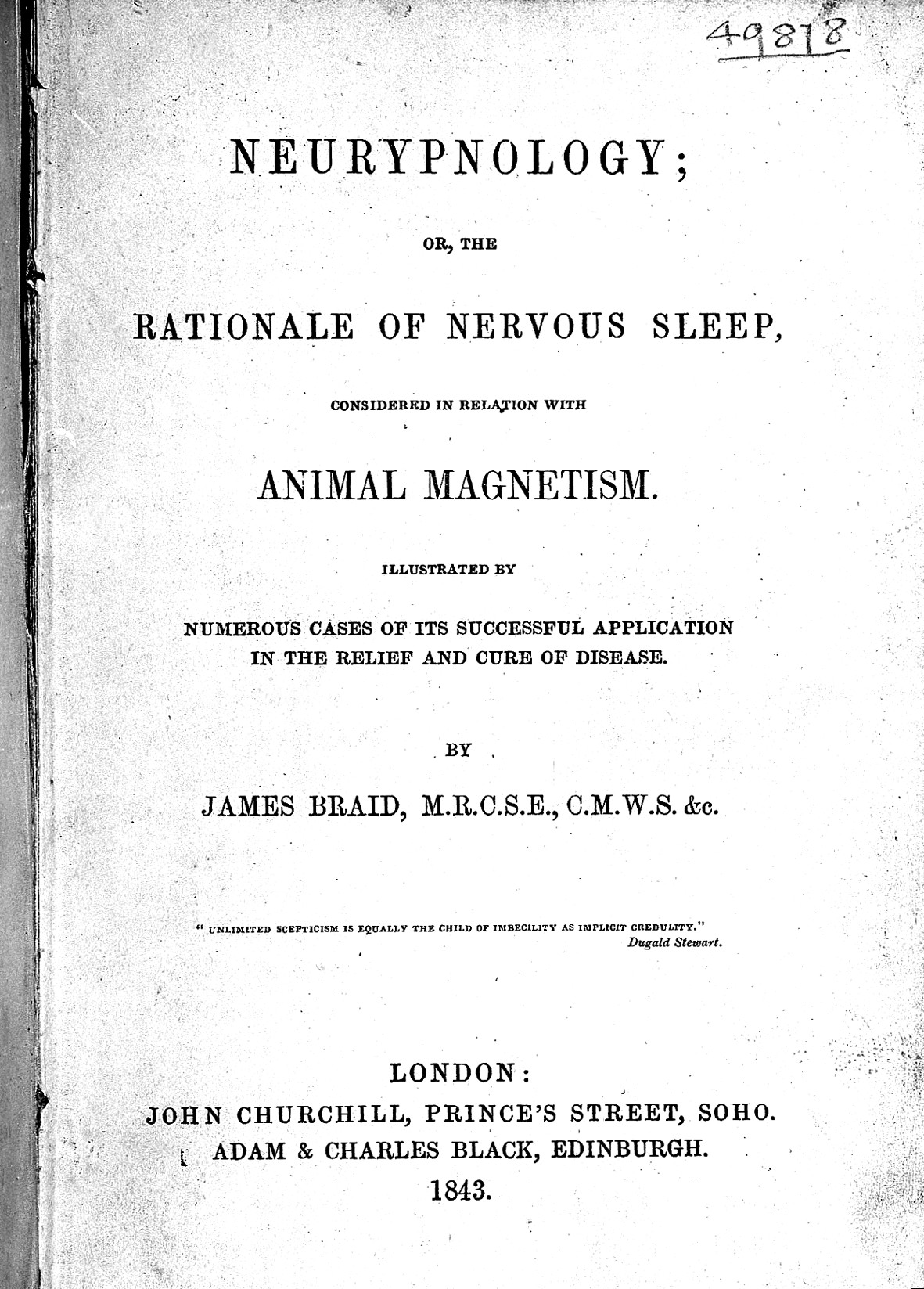
Neurypnology (1843).

In 1843, he published Neurypnology; or the Rationale of Nervous Sleep Considered in Relation with Animal Magnetism..., his first and only book-length exposition of his views. According to Bramwell, the work was popular from the outset, selling 800 copies within a few months of its publication.

Braid thought of hypnotism as producing a "nervous sleep" which differed from ordinary sleep. The most efficient way to produce it was through visual fixation on a small bright object held eighteen inches above and in front of the eyes. Braid regarded the physiological condition underlying hypnotism to be the over-exercising of the eye muscles through the straining of attention.

He completely rejected Franz Mesmer's idea that a magnetic fluid caused hypnotic phenomena, because anyone could produce them in "himself by attending strictly to the simple rules" that he had laid down. The (derogative) proposal that Braidism be adopted as a synonym for "hypnotism" was rejected by Braid; and it was rarely used at the time of that proposition, and is never used today.

== Braid's "sources of fallacy" ==
Nearly a year after the publication of Neurypnology, the secretary of the Royal Manchester Institution invited Braid to conduct a conversazione in the Institution's lecture theatre on Monday, 22 April 1844.

Braid spoke at considerable length to a very large audience on hypnotism; and also gave details of the important differences he had identified between his "hypnotism" and mesmerism/animal magnetism. According to the extensive press reports, "the interest felt by the members of the institution in the subject was manifested by the attendance of one of the largest audiences we ever recollect to have seen present".

Braid’s "Sources of Fallacy"

Braid successfully demonstrated that many of the alleged phenomena of mesmerism owed their origin to defective methods of observation. He drew out a list of the more important sources of error which, he said, ought always to be kept in mind by the operator. These … should be placed in a prominent position in every hypnotic laboratory:
(1) The hyperæsthesia of the organs of special sense, which enabled impressions to be perceived through the ordinary media that would have passed unrecognised in the waking condition.
(2) The docility and sympathy of the subjects, which tended to make them imitate the actions of others.
(3) The extraordinary revival of memory by which they could recall things long forgotten in the waking state.
(4) The remarkable effect of contact in arousing memory, i.e. by acting as the signal for the production of a fresh [state of hypnotism].
(5) The condition of double consciousness or double personality.
(6) The vivid state of the imagination in hypnosis, which instantly invested every suggested idea, or remembrance of past impressions, with the attributes of present realities.
(7) Deductions rapidly drawn by the subject from unintentional suggestions given by the operator.
(8) The tendency of the human mind, in those with a great love of the marvellous, erroneously to interpret the subject's replies in accordance with their own desires.
(Bramwell, 1903, p. 144.)

In his presentation Braid stressed that, because he had clearly demonstrated that the effects of hypnotism were "quite reconcilable with well-established physiological and psychological principles" (viz., they were well connected to the prevailing canonical knowledge), it was highly significant that none of the extraordinary effects that the mesmerists and animal magnetists routinely claimed for their operations – such as clairvoyance, direct mental suggestion, and mesmeric intuition – could be produced with hypnotism. So, he argued, it was clear that their claims were entirely without foundation.
However, he also stressed to his audience that, whilst it was, indeed, entirely true that these effects could not be produced with hypnotism – and whilst the claims of the mesmerists and animal magnetists were, ipso facto, entirely false – one must not make the mistake of concluding that this was unequivocal evidence of deception, dishonesty, or outright fraud on the part of those making these erroneous claims.
In Braid’s view (given that many of the proponents of such views were decent men, and that their experiences had been honestly recounted), the only possible explanation was that their observations were seriously flawed.
To Braid, these faults in their investigatory processes were "the chief source of error". He urged the audience – before any of the claims of the mesmerists and animal magnetists could be examined in any way, or any of their findings investigated, or any confidence be placed in any of the recorded results of any of their experiments – that the entire process of the research that they had conducted, the investigative procedures that they had employed, and the experimental design that had underpinned their enterprise must be closely examined for the presence of what he termed "sources of fallacy".
In the process of delivering his lecture, Braid spoke in some detail of six "sources of fallacy" that could contaminate findings. – Yeates, (2013), pp. 741–42.

In 1903, Bramwell published a list of eight "sources of fallacy" attributed to Braid; the final two having been directly paraphrased, by Bramwell, from other aspects of Braid's later works (see text at right).

In 1853, Braid investigated the phenomenon of "table-turning" and clearly confirmed Michael Faraday's conclusion that the phenomenon was entirely due to the ideo-motor influences of the participants, rather than to the agency of "mesmeric forces" – as was being widely asserted by, for example, John Elliotson and his followers.

== The mono-ideo-dynamic principle ==
On 12 March 1852, convinced (as both a scientist and physiologist) of the genuineness of Braid's hypnotism, Braid's friend and colleague William Benjamin Carpenter presented a significant paper, "On the influence of Suggestion in Modifying and directing Muscular Movement, independently of Volition", to the Royal Institution of Great Britain (it was published later that year).

Braid's theoretical position

I shall conclude this [lecture] by a very simple mode of illustration, as respects the different points of view in which the mesmerists, the electro-biologists, and myself, stand toward each other in theory, by referring to the two theories of light contended for at the present time. Some believe in a positive emission from the sun of a subtile material, or imponderable influence, as the cause of light; whilst others deny this emission theory, and contend that light is produced by simple vibration excited by the sun, without any positive emission from that luminary. I may, therefore, be said to have adopted the vibratory theory, whilst the mesmerists and electro-biologists contend for the emission theory. But my experiments have proved that the ordinary phenomena of mesmerism may be realised through the subjective or personal mental and physical acts of the patient alone; whereas the proximity, acts, or influence of a second party, would be indispensably requisite for their production, if the theory of the mesmerists were true. Moreover, my experiments have proved that audible, visible, or tangible suggestions of another person, whom the subject believes to possess such power over him, is requisite for the production of the waking phenomena; whereas no audible, visible, or tangible suggestion from a second party ought to be required to produce these phenomena, if the theory of the electro-biologists were true.
There is, therefore, both positive and negative proof in favour of my mental and suggestive theory, and in opposition to the magnetic, occult, or electric theories of the mesmerists and electro-biologists. My theory, moreover, has this additional recommendation, that it is level to our comprehension, and adequate to account for all which is demonstrably true, without offering any violence to reason and common sense, or being at variance with generally admitted physiological and psychological principles. Under these circumstances, therefore, I trust that you will consider me entitled to your verdict in favour of my MENTAL THEORY.
James Braid (26 March 1851)

Carpenter explained that the "class of phenomena" associated with Braid's hypnotism were consequent upon a subject's concentration on a single, "dominant idea": namely, "the occupation of the mind by the ideas which have been suggested to it, and in the influence which these ideas exert upon the actions of the body". Moreover, Carpenter said, "it is not really the will of the operator which controls the sensations of the subject; but the suggestion of the operator which excites a corresponding idea": the suggested idea "not only [producing non-volitional] muscular movements [through this psychosomatic mechanism], but other bodily changes [as well]" (1852, p. 148).

In order to reconcile the observed hypnotic phenomena "with the known laws of nervous action" (p. 153), and without elaborating on mechanism, Carpenter identified a new psycho-physiological reflex activity – in addition to the already identified excito-motor (which was responsible for breathing, swallowing, etc.), and the sensori-motor (which was responsible for startle responses, etc.) – that of "the ideo-motor principle of action". At the conclusion of his paper, Carpenter briefly noted that his proposed ideo-motor principle of action, specifically created to explain Braid's hypnotism, could also explain other activities involving objectively psychosomatic responses, such as the movements of divining rods:

"Thus the ideo-motor principle of action finds its appropriate place in the physiological scale, which would, indeed, be incomplete without it.
And, when it is once recognized, it may be applied to the explanation of numerous phenomena which have been a source of perplexity to many who have been convinced of their genuineness, and who could not see any mode of reconciling them with the known laws of nervous action.
The phenomena in question are those which have been recently set down to the action of an "Od-force", such, for example, as the movements of the "divining-rod", and the vibration of bodies suspended from the finger; both which have been clearly proved to depend on the state of expectant attention on the part of the performer, his Will being temporarily withdrawn from control over his muscles by the state of abstraction to which his mind is given up, and the anticipation of a given result being the stimulus which directly and involuntarily prompts the muscular movements that produce it. – Carpenter (1852, p. 153)

Braid immediately adopted Carpenter's ideo-motor terminology. In order to stress the importance (within Braid's own representation) of the single, "dominant" idea concept, Braid spoke of a "mono-ideo-motor principle of action". However, by 1855, based on suggestions that had been made to Carpenter by their friend in common, Daniel Noble — that Carpenter's innovation would be more accurately understood, and more accurately applied (viz., not just limited to divining rods and pendulums), if it were designated the "ideo-dynamic principle" — Braid was referring to a "mono-ideo-dynamic principle of action":

"[The explanation for] the power that serpents have to fascinate birds … is simply this – that when the attention of man or animal is deeply engrossed or absorbed by a given idea associated with movement, a current of nervous force is sent into the muscles which produces a corresponding motion, not only without any conscious effort of volition, but even in opposition to volition, in many instances; and hence they seem to be irresistibly drawn, or spell-bound, according to the purport of the dominant idea or impression in the mind of each at the time.
The volition is prostrate; the individual is so completely monoideised, or under the influence of the dominant idea, as to be incapable of exerting an efficient restraining or opposing power to the dominant idea; and in the case of the bird and serpent, it is first wonder which arrests the creature's attention, and then fear causes that mono-ideo-dynamic action of the muscles which involuntarily issues in the advance and capture of the unhappy bird …
It is this very principle of involuntary muscular action from a dominant idea which has got possession of the mind, and the suggestions conveyed to the mind by the muscular action which flows from it, which led so many to be deceived during their experiments in "table-turning", and induced them to believe that the table was drawing them, whilst all the while they were unconsciously drawing or pushing it by their own muscular force. – Braid, Physiology of Fascination, etc., (1855, pp. 3–5).

"In order that I may do full justice to two esteemed friends, I beg to state, in connection with this term monoideo-dynamics, that, several years ago, Dr. W. B. Carpenter introduced the term ideo-motor to characterise the reflex or automatic muscular motions which arise merely from ideas associated with motion existing in the mind, without any conscious effort of volition.
In 1853, in referring to this term, Dr. Noble said, "Ideo-dynamic would probably constitute a phraseology more appropriate, as applicable to a wider range of phenomena".
In this opinion I quite concurred, because I was well aware that an idea could arrest as well as excite motion automatically, not only in the muscles of voluntary motion, but also as regards the condition of every other function of the body.
I have, therefore, adopted the term monoideo-dynamics, as still more comprehensive and characteristic as regards the true mental relations which subsist during all dynamic changes which take place, in every other function of the body, as well as in the muscles of voluntary motion. – Braid, (1855, footnote at p . 10).

== Jenny Lind and James Braid ==
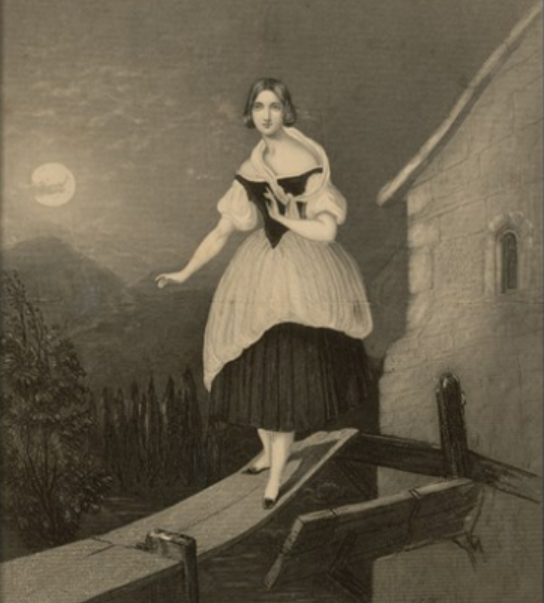
Jenny Lind, as Amina, sleep-walking on narrow planks, in the 1840s

In August 1847, the famous soprano Jenny Lind visited Manchester, and gave two performances as Amina, in Bellini's 1831 Italian opera semiseria, La sonnambula. Lind's admirers maintained that, "whilst the beauty of her voice was far greater than any other in living memory (thus, the Swedish Nightingale), what really set her apart was her outstanding ability to act". For example, in La sonnambula, in the scenes where Amina was sleep-walking (e.g., over a rickety bridge at a mill), rather than walking along a wide and well-protected walkway (as other sopranos did), Lind routinely acrobatically balanced her way along narrow planks.

At that time, many characterized hypnotism as "artificial somnambulism" – Lind's stage performance could be described as "artificial" rather than spontaneous somnambulism – and so while Lind was in Manchester her friends arranged for her to visit James Braid, where it was reported that:

"Mr. Braid, surgeon, whose discoveries in hypnotism are well known, having invited the fair impersonator of a somnambulist to witness some of the abnormal feats of a real somnambulist, artificially thrown into that state, it was arranged that a private séance should take place [on 3 September 1847]." (Manchester Guardian, 8 September 1847)

== Death ==
Braid maintained an active interest in hypnotism until his death.

"I consider the hypnotic mode of treating certain disorders is a most important ascertained fact, and a real solid addition to practical therapeutics, for there is a variety of cases in which it is really most successful, and to which it is most particularly adapted; and those are the very cases in which ordinary medical means are least successful, or altogether unavailing. Still, I repudiate the notion of holding up hypnotism as a panacaea or universal remedy. As formerly remarked, I use hypnotism ALONE only in a certain class of cases, to which I consider it peculiarly adapted – and I use it in conjunction with medical treatment, in some other cases; but, in the great majority of cases, I do not use hypnotism at all, but depend entirely upon the efficacy of medical, moral, dietetic, and hygienic treatment, prescribing active medicines in such doses as are calculated to produce obvious effects" – James Braid

Just three days before his death he sent a (now lost) manuscript, that was written in English – usually referred to as On hypnotism – to the French surgeon Étienne Eugène Azam.

Braid died on 25 March 1860, aged 64, in Manchester, after just a few hours of illness. According to some contemporary accounts he died from "apoplexy", and according to others he died from "heart disease". He was survived by his wife, his son James (a general practitioner, rather than a surgeon), and his daughter.

== Influence ==
Hypnotism: a means by which "natural functions" can be directed
(James Braid, 1853).

The hypnotic state ... is essentially a state of mental concentration, in which the faculties of the mind of the patient are so engrossed with a single idea or train of thought ... to be dead or indifferent to all other considerations and influences ... [and which] intensifies, in a correspondingly greater degree, whatever influence the mind of the individual can produce upon his physical functions during the waking condition. ...
[The suggestions made to the patient] draw and fix his attention to one part or function of his body, and withdraw it from others, [such that] whatever influence such suggestions and impressions are capable of producing during the ordinary waking condition [have] correspondingly greater effect during the nervous sleep, when the attention is so much more concentrated, and the imagination and faith, or expectant idea in the mind of the patient, are so much more intense than in the ordinary waking condition.

************************

[Given the influence of psychosomatic effects], it should follow ... that if we can attain to any mode of intensifying the mental power, we should thus realise, in a corresponding degree, greater control over physical action.
Now, this is precisely what my processes do — they create no new faculties; but they give us greater control over the natural functions than we possess during the ordinary waking condition, and particularly in intensifying mental influence, or the power of the mind of the patient over his own physical functions; and of a fixed dominant idea and physical state of the organs over faculties of the mind during the dominance of such fixed ideas.

Braid's work had a strong influence on a number of important French medical figures, especially Étienne Eugène Azam (1822–1899) of Bordeaux (Braid's principal French "disciple"), the anatomist Pierre Paul Broca (1824–1880), the physiologist Joseph Pierre Durand de Gros (1826–1901), and (per medium of Azam) the eminent hypnotherapist, and one of the founders of the Nancy School, Ambroise-Auguste Liébeault (1823–1904).

Braid hypnotised the English Swedenborgian writer J.J.G. Wilkinson, who observed him hypnotising others several times, and began using hypnotism himself. Wilkinson soon became a passionate advocate of Braid's work and his published remarks on hypnotism were quoted enthusiastically by Braid several times in his later writings. However, Braid's legacy was maintained in Great Britain largely by John Milne Bramwell who collected all of his available works and published a biography and account of Braid's theory and practice as well as several books on hypnotism of his own (see below).

== Works ==
Braid published many letters and articles in journals and newspapers; he also published several pamphlets, and a number of books (many of which were compendiums of his previously published works).

His first major publication was Neurypnology, or the Rationale of Nervous Sleep (1843), written less than two years after his discovery of hypnotism.

He continued revising his theories and his clinical applications of hypnotism, based on his experiments and his empirical experience. Six weeks before his death, in a letter to The Medical Circular, Braid spoke of continuously having the daily experience of applying hypnotism in his practice for nineteen years; and, in a letter to The Critic, written four weeks before his death (this was his last published letter), he spoke of how his experiments and clinical experience had convinced him that all of the effects of hypnotism were generated "by influences residing entirely within, and not without, the patient's own body".

In 1851, Garth Wilkinson published a description of Braid's "hypnotism", which Braid described, two years later, as "a beautiful description of [my system of] hypnotism".

In April 2009, Robertson published a reconstructed English version, backward translated from the French, of Braid's last (lost) manuscript, On Hypnotism, addressed by Braid to the French Academy of Sciences.

== Bramwell: promoter and defender of Braid's heritage ==
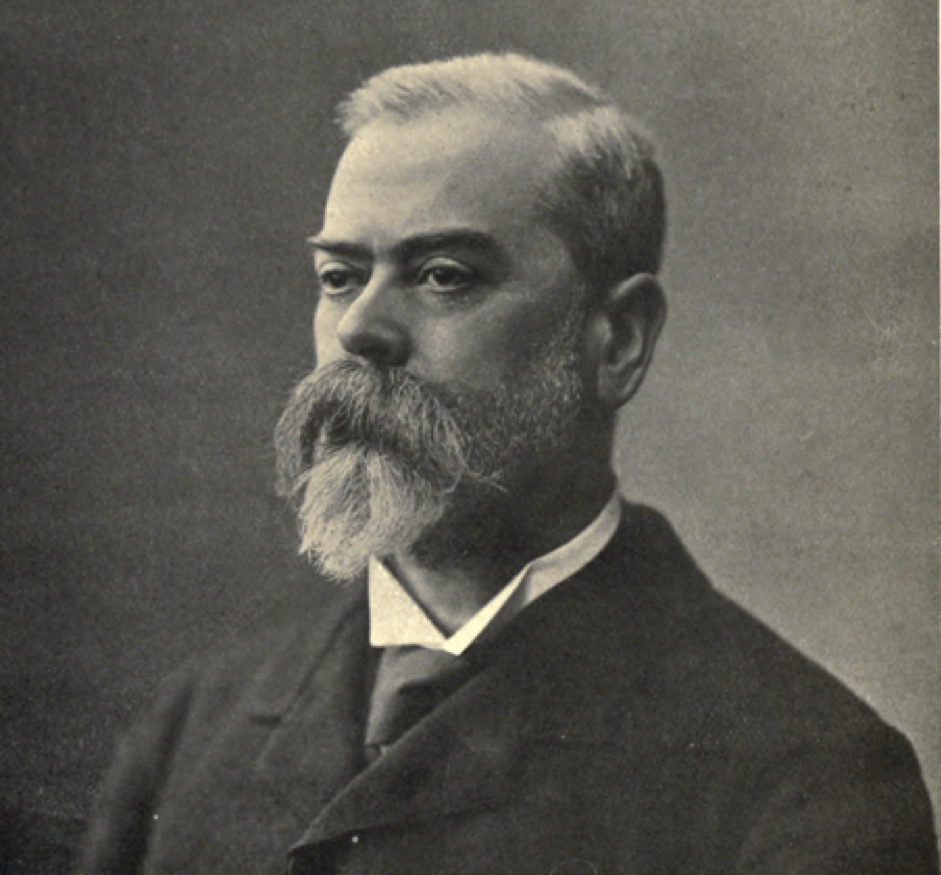
John Milne Bramwell.

John Milne Bramwell, M.B. C.M., a specialist medical hypnotist and hypnotherapist himself, made a deep study of Braid's works and helped to revive and maintain Braid's legacy in Great Britain.

Bramwell had studied medicine at Edinburgh University in the same student cohort as Braid's grandson, Charles. Consequently, due to his Edinburgh studies – especially those with John Hughes Bennett (1812–1875), author of The Mesmeric Mania of 1851, With a Physiological Explanation of the Phenomena Produced (1851) – Bramwell was very familiar with Braid and his work; and, more significantly, through Charles Braid, he also had unfettered access to those publications, records, papers, etc. of Braid that were still held by the Braid family. He was, perhaps, second only to Preyer in his wide-ranging familiarity with Braid and his works.

In 1896, Bramwell noted that, "[Braid's name] is familiar to all students of hypnotism and is rarely mentioned by them without due credit being given to the important part he played in rescuing that science from ignorance and superstition". He found that almost all of those students believed that Braid "held many erroneous views" and that "the researches of more recent investigators [had] disproved [those erroneous views]".

Finding that "few seem to be acquainted with any of [Braid's] works except Neurypnology or with the fact that [Neurypnology] was only one of a long series on the subject of hypnotism, and that in the later ones his views completely changed", Bramwell was convinced that this ignorance of Braid, which sprang from "imperfect knowledge of his writings", was further compounded by at least three "universally adopted opinions"; viz., that Braid was English (Braid was a Scot), "believed in phrenology" (Braid did not), and "knew nothing of suggestion" (when, in fact, Braid was its strongest advocate, and, also, was first to apply the term "suggestion" to the practice).

Bramwell rejected the mistaken view – very widely promoted by Hippolyte Bernheim – that Braid knew nothing of suggestion, and that the entire 'history' of suggestive therapeutics began with the Nancy "Suggestion" School in the late 1880s, had no foundation whatsoever:

The difference between Braid and the Nancy School, with regard to suggestion, is entirely one of theory, not of practice.

Braid employed verbal suggestion in hypnosis just as intelligently as any member of the Nancy school.
This fact is denied by Bernheim, who says:
"It is strange that Braid did not think of applying suggestion in its most natural form – suggestion by speech – to bring about hypnosis and its therapeutic effects. He did not dream of explaining the curative effects of hypnotism by means of the psychical influence of suggestion, but made use of suggestion without knowing it."
This statement has its sole origin in [Bernheim’s] ignorance of Braid's later works…
[Unlike Bernheim, Braid] did not consider [verbal] suggestion as explanatory of hypnotic phenomena, but… [he] looked upon it simply as an artifice used to excite [those phenomena].

[Braid] considered that the mental phenomena were only rendered possible by previous physical changes; and, as the result of these, the operator was enabled to act like an engineer, and to direct the forces which existed in the subject's own person. (Bramwell, 1903, pp. 338–39)

External images
- Student Record for James Braid; Source: University of Edinburgh, Centre for Research Collections, Individual Records, Students of Medicine (1762–1826)
- Entry for both James Braid and his son in the (first) U.K. medical register of 1859 (bottom of page 38), indicating that Braid never held a M.D., and that he was a surgeon.

In 1897, Bramwell wrote on Braid's work for an important French hypnotism journal ("James Braid: son œuvre et ses écrits"). He also wrote on hypnotism and suggestion, strongly emphasizing the importance of Braid and his work ("La Valeur Therapeutique de l'Hypnotisme et de la Suggestion"). In his response, Bernheim repeated his entirely mistaken view that Braid knew nothing of suggestion (""A propos de l'étude sur James Braid par le Dr. Milne Bramwell, etc."). Bramwell's response ("James Braid et la Suggestion, etc.") to Bernheim's misrepresentation was emphatic:

"I answered [Bernheim], giving quotations from Braid's published works, which clearly showed that he not only employed suggestion as intelligently as the members of the Nancy school now do, but also that his conception of its nature was clearer than theirs" (Hypnotism, etc. (1913), p. 28).

== Sources ==
=== Braid's publications (in chronological order) ===
- Braid, J., Satanic Agency and Mesmerism Reviewed, In A Letter to the Reverend H. Mc. Neile, A.M., of Liverpool, in Reply to a Sermon Preached by Him in St. Jude's Church, Liverpool, on Sunday, 10 April 1842, by James Braid, Surgeon, Manchester, Simms and Dinham, and Galt and Anderson, (Manchester), 1842.
  - A transcription of the text of Braid's pamphlet is presented at Volgyesi, (Winter 1955), "Discovery of Medical Hypnotism: Part 2"; Volgyesi's transcription is reprinted at Robertson (Discovery of Hypnosis), pp. 375–81. Another transcription is presented at Tinterow (Foundations of Hypnosis), pp. 317–30.
    Both of these transcriptions have errors; a complete transcription, corrected with direct reference to an original copy of Braid's pamphlet, and annotated for the modern reader is at Yeates (2013), pp. 671–700.
    N.B. Braid intended that his pamphlet was to be read in association with the newspaper report in the Macclesfield Courier of Saturday, 16 April 1842. A complete transcription of the newspaper article, annotated for the modern reader is at Yeates (2013), pp. 599–620.
- Braid, J., Neurypnology or the Rationale of Nervous Sleep Considered in Relation with Animal Magnetism Illustrated by Numerous Cases of its Successful Application in the Relief and Cure of Disease, John Churchill, (London), 1843.
  - N.B. Braid's Errata, detailing a number of important corrections that need to be made to the foregoing text, is on the un-numbered page following p. 265.
- Braid, J., "Observations on the Phenomena of Phreno-Mesmerism", The Medical Times, Vol. 9, No. 216, (11 November 1843), pp. 74–75; reprinted at The Phrenological Journal, and Magazine of Moral Science, Vol. 17, No. 78, (January 1844), pp. 18–26.
- Braid, J., "Observations on Mesmeric and Hypnotic Phenomena", The Medical Times, Vol. 10, No. 238, (13 April 1844), pp. 31–32, (20 April 1844), pp. 47–49.
- Braid, J., "The Effect of Garlic on the Magnetic Needle", The Medical Times, Vol. 10, No. 241, (4 May 1844), pp. 98–99.
- Braid, J., "Physiological Explanation of Some Mesmeric Phenomena", The Medical Times, Vol. 10, No. 258, (31 August 1844), pp. 450–51; reprinted as "Remarks on Mr. Simpson’s Letter on Hypnotism, published in the Phrenological Journal for July 1844", The Phrenological Journal, and Magazine of Moral Science, Vol. 17, No. 81, (October 1844), pp. 359–65.
- Braid, J., "Experimental Inquiry, to Determine whether Hypnotic and Mesmeric Manifestations can be Adduced in Proof of Phrenology", The Medical Times, Vol. 11, No. 271, (30 November 1844), pp. 181–82.
- Braid, J. "Magic, Mesmerism, Hypnotism, etc., Historically and Physiologically Considered", Medical Times, Vol. 11, No. 272, (7 December 1844), pp. 203–04, No. 273, (14 December 1844), pp. 224–27, No. 275, (28 December 1844), pp. 270–73, No. 276, (4 January 1845), pp. 296–99, No. 277, (11 January 1845), pp. 318–20, No. 281, (8 February 1845), pp. 399–400, No. 283, (22 February 1845), pp. 439–41.
- Braid, J., "Experimental Inquiry to determine whether Hypnotic and Mesmeric Manifestations can be adduced in proof of Phrenology. By James Braid, M.R.C.S.E., Manchester. (From the Medical Times, No. 271, 30 November 1844)", The Phrenological Journal, and Magazine of Moral Science, Vol. 18, No. 83, (1845), pp. 156–62.
- Braid, J., "Hypnotism" (Letter to the Editor), The Lancet, Vol. 45, No. 1135, (31 May 1845), pp. 627–28.
- Braid, J., "The Power of the Mind over the Body: An Experimental Inquiry into the Nature and Cause of the Phenomena Attributed by Baron Reichenbach and Others to a "New Imponderable". By James Braid, M.R.C.S. Edin., &c., Manchester", The Medical Times, Vol. 14, No. 350, (13 June 1846), pp. 214–16, No. 352, (27 June 1846), pp. 252–54, No. 353, (4 July 1846), pp. 273–74.
- Braid, J., The Power of the Mind over the Body: An Experimental Inquiry into the Nature and Cause of the Phenomena Attributed by Baron Reichenbach and Others to a "New Imponderable", John Churchill, (London), 1846. (A note, in Braid's handwriting, is at p. 3).
- Braid, J., "Facts and Observations as to the Relative Value of Mesmeric and Hypnotic Coma, and Ethereal Narcotism, for the Mitigation or Entire Prevention of Pain during Surgical Operations", The Medical Times, Vol.15, No.385, (13 February 1847), pp. 381–382, Vol.16, No.387, (27 February 1847), pp. 10–11.
- Braid, J., "Observations on the Use of Ether for Preventing Pain during Surgical Operations, and the Moral Abuse which it is Capable of Being Converted to", The Medical Times, Vol.16, No.393, (10 April 1847), pp. 130–132.
- Braid J. (1849). "Letter to the Editor of The British Record of Obstetric Medicine and Surgery (on the use of ether and chloroform for surgical and obstetric purposes)". The British Record of Obstetric Medicine and Surgery. 2: 55–59.
- Braid, J., Observations on Trance; or, Human Hybernation, John Churchill, (London), 1850.
- Braid, J., "Electro-Biological Phenomena Physiologically and Psychologically Considered, by James Braid, M.R.C.S. Edinburgh, &c. &c. (Lecture delivered at the Royal Institution, Manchester, March 26, 1851)", The Monthly Journal of Medical Science, Vol. 12, (June 1851), pp. 511–30.
- Braid, J., Magic, Witchcraft, Animal Magnetism, Hypnotism, and Electro-Biology; Being a Digest of the Latest Views of the Author on these Subjects (Third Edition), John Churchill, (London), 1852.
- Braid, J., "Mysterious Table Moving", The Manchester Examiner and Times, Vol. 5, No. 469, (Saturday, 30 April 1853), p. 5, col.B.
- Braid, J., "Hypnotic Therapeutics, Illustrated by Cases. By JAMES BRAID, Esq., Surgeon, of Manchester", The Monthly Journal of Medical Science, Vol. 17, (July 1853), pp. 14–47.
- Braid, J., "Letter to Michael Faraday on the phenomenon of "Table Turning" [written on 22 August 1853]", reprinted at pp. 560–61 of James, F.A.J.L., The Correspondence of Michael Faraday, Volume 4: January 1849 – October 1855, Institution of Electrical Engineers, (London), 1999.
- Braid, J., Hypnotic Therapeutics, Illustrated by Cases: With an Appendix on Table-Moving and Spirit-Rapping. Reprinted from the Monthly Journal of Medical Science for July 1853, Murray and Gibbs, (Edinburgh), 1853.
- Braid, J., "On the Nature and Treatment of Certain Forms of Paralysis", Association Medical Journal, Vol. 3, No. 141, (14 September 1855), pp. 848–55.
- Braid, J., The Physiology of Fascination, and the Critics Criticised (a two-part pamphlet], John Murray, (Manchester), 1855. (The second part is a reply to attacks made in The Zoist.)
- Braid, J., "The Physiology of Fascination" (Miscellaneous Contribution to the Botany and Zoology including Physiology Section), Report of the Twenty-Fifth Meeting of the British Association; Held at Glasgow in September 1855, John Murray, (London), 1856, pp. 120–21.
- Braid, J., "Chemical Analysis – The Rudgeley Poisoning", The Manchester Guardian, No. 3051, (Saturday, 31 May 1856), p. 5, col.C.
- Braid, J., "The Bite of the Tsetse: Arsenic Suggested as a Remedy (Letter to the Editor, written on 6 February 1858)", British Medical Journal, Vol. 1, No. 59, (13 February 1858), p. 135.
- Braid, J., "Arsenic as a Remedy for the Bite of the Tsetse, Etc. (Letter to the Editor, written in March 1858)", British Medical Journal, Vol. 1, No. 63, (13 March 1858), pp. 214–15.
- Braid, J., "Mr Braid on Hypnotism (Letter to the Editor, written on 21 February 1860)", The Medical Circular, Vol. 16, (7 March 1860), pp. 158–59.
- Braid, J., "Hypnotism (Letter to the Editor, written on 26 February 1860)", The Critic, Vol. 20, No. 505, (10 March 1860), p. 312.

=== Other editions of Braid's publications ===
- Preyer, W. (ed.), Der Hypnotismus. Ausgewählte Schriften von J. Braid. Deutsch herausgegeben von W. Preyer (On Hypnotism; Selected Writings of J. Braid, in German, edited by W. Preyer.), Verlag von Gebrüder Paetel, (Berlin), 1882.
- Preyer, W., Der Hypnotismus: Vorlesungen gehalten an der K. Friedrich-Wilhelm’s-Universität zu Berlin, von W. Preyer. Nebst Anmerkungen und einer nachgelassenen Abhandlung von Braid aus dem Jahre 1845 (Hypnotism: Lectures delivered at the Emperor Frederick William’s University at Berlin by W. Preyer. With Notes and a Posthumous Paper of Braid From the Year 1845), Urban & Schwarzenberg, 1890.
- Preyer, W., Die Entdeckung des Hypnotismus. Dargestellt von W. Preyer … Nebst einer ungedruckten Original-Abhandlung von Braid in Deutscher Uebersetzung (The Discovery of Hypnotism, presented by W. Preyer, together with a hithertofore unpublished paper by Braid in its German translation), Verlag von Gebrüder Paetel, (Berlin), 1881.
- Robertson D (April 2009). ""On hypnotism" (1860) De l'hypnotisme". The International Journal of Clinical and Experimental Hypnosis. 57 (2): 133–61. doi:10.1080/00207140802665377. PMID 19234963. S2CID 10410982.
- Robertson, D. (ed), The Discovery of Hypnosis: The Complete Writings of James Braid, The Father of Hypnotherapy, National Council for Hypnotherapy, (Studley), 2009. ISBN 0956057004
- Braid, J. (Simon, J. trans.), Neurypnologie: Traité du Sommeil Nerveux, ou, Hypnotisme par James Braid; Traduit de l'anglais par le Dr Jules Simon; Avec preface de C. E. Brown-Séquard (Neurypnology: Treatise on Nervous Sleep or Hypnotism by James Braid, translated from the English by Dr. Jules Simon, with a preface by C. E. Brown-Séquard.), Adrien Delhaye et Émile Lecrosnier, (Paris), 1883.
- Tinterow, M.M., Foundations of Hypnosis: From Mesmer to Freud, Charles C. Thomas, (Springfield), 1970. (contains transcription of Braid's "Satanic Agency and Mesmerism")
- Volgyesi, F.A., "Discovery of Medical Hypnotism: J. Braid: "Satanic Agency and Mesmerism", etc. Preface and Interpretation by Dr. F. A. Volgyesi (Budapest). Part I", The British Journal of Medical Hypnotism, Vol. 7, No. 1, (Autumn 1955), pp. 2–13; "Part 2", No. 2, (Winter 1955), pp. 25–34; "Part 3", No. 3, (Spring 1956), pp. 25–31.
- Waite, A.E., Braid on Hypnotism: Neurypnology. A New Edition, Edited with an Introduction, Biographical and Bibliographical, Embodying the Author’s Later Views and Further Evidence on the Subject by Arthur Edward Waite, George Redway, (London), 1899.
  - A re-issue of the 1899 edition of Waite, with an additional foreword by "J.H. Conn, M.D., Pres., Society for Clinical and Experimental Hypnosis, The Johns Hopkins University Medical School, Baltimore, Md." was released in 1960 as: Braid, J., Braid on Hypnotism: The Beginnings of Modern Hypnosis, The Julian Press, (New York), 1960. N.B.: The (1960) book's title page, cover, and dust jacket all mistakenly refer to "James Braid, M.D." (instead of the 1899 original's "James Braid, M.R.C.S., C.M.W.S., &c.").

=== Other sources ===
- Anon, "Jenny Lind and the Mesmerist", The Maitland Mercury and Hunter River General Advertiser, (Wednesday, 26 January 1848), p.1.
- Anon, "On Animal Magnetism", The London Medical Gazette, Vol. 20, No. 533, (17 February 1838), pp. 824–29; No. 534; (24 February 1838), pp. 856–60; No. 537, (17 March 1838), pp. 986–91; and No. 538, (24 March 1838), pp. 1034–37.
- Anon, "Abstract of a Lecture on Electro-Biology, delivered at the Royal Institution, Manchester, on the 26th March 1851. By James Braid, M.R.C.S., Edinburgh, C.M.W.S., &c. &c.", Edinburgh Medical and Surgical Journal, Vol. 76, No. 188, (1 July 1851), pp. 239–48.
- Anon, "Hypnotism – Important Medical Discovery", The New York Herald, (Thursday, 5 January 1860), p. 5, col B.
- Anon, "Sudden Death of Mr. James Braid, Surgeon, of Manchester", The Lancet, Vol. 75, No. 1909, (31 March 1860), p. 335.
- Bernheim, H., "A propos de l'étude sur James Braid par le Dr. Milne Bramwell, et de son rapport lu au Congrès de Bruxelles [With Regard to the Study of James Braid by Dr. Milne Bramwell, and his Report Read to the Congress at Brussels]", Revue de l'Hypnotisme Expérimentale & Thérapeutique, Vol. 12, No. 5, (November 1897), pp. 137–45.
- Bramwell, J.M., "James Braid: His Work and Writings", Proceedings of the Society for Psychical Research, Vol. 12, Supplement, (1896), pp. 127–66.
- Bramwell, J.M., "Personally Observed Hypnotic Phenomena", Proceedings of the Society for Psychical Research, Vol. 12, Supplement, (1896), pp. 176–203.
- Bramwell, J.M., "James Braid: Surgeon and Hypnotist", Brain, Vol. 19, No. 1, (1896), pp. 90–116.
- Bramwell, J.M., "On the Evolution of Hypnotic Theory", Brain, Vol. 19, No. 4, (1896), pp. 459–568.
- Bramwell, M., "James Braid: son œuvre et ses écrits [James Braid: His Work and Writings]", Revue de l'Hypnotisme Expérimentale & Thérapeutique, Vol. 12, No. 1, (July 1897), pp. 27–30; No. 2, (August 1897), pp. 60–63; (September 1897), pp. 87–91.
- Bramwell, M., "La Valeur Therapeutique de l'Hypnotisme et de la Suggestion [The Therapeutic Value of Hypnotism and Suggestion]", Revue de l'Hypnotisme Expérimentale & Thérapeutique, Vol. 12, No. 5, (November 1897), pp. 129–37.
- Bramwell, J.M., "James Braid et la Suggestion: Réponse à M. le Professeur Bernheim (de Nancy) par M. le Dr. Milne-Bramwell (de Londres) [James Braid and Suggestion: A Response to Professor Bernheim (of Nancy) from Dr. Milne-Bramwell (of London)]", Revue de l'Hypnotisme Expérimentale & Thérapeutique, Vol. 12, No. 12, (June 1898), pp. 353–61.
- Bramwell, J.M., Hypnotic and Post-hypnotic Appreciation of Time: Secondary and Multiplex Personalities, Brain, Vol. 23, No. 2, (1900), pp. 161–238.
- Bramwell, J.M., "Hypnotism: An Outline Sketch – Being a Lecture delivered before the King's College Medical Society", The Clinical Journal, Vol. 20, No. 3, (Wednesday, 7 May 1902), pp. 41–45; No. 4, (Wednesday, 14 May 1902), pp. 60–64.
- Bramwell, J.M., Hypnotism: Its History, Practice and Theory, Grant Richards, (London), 1903.
- Bramwell, J.M., Hypnotism: Its History, Practice and Theory (Second Edition), De La More Press, (London), 1906.
- Bramwell, J.M., Hypnotism and Treatment by Suggestion, Cassell & Co., (London), 1909. (Funk and Wagnalls, New York, 1910)
- Bramwell, J.M., Hypnotism: Its History, Practice and Theory (Third Edition), William Rider & Son, (London), 1913.
- Brown, Thomas (1851), Lectures on the Philosophy of the Human Mind (Nineteenth Edition), Edinburgh: Adam & Charles Black.
- Carpenter, W.B., "On the Influence of Suggestion in Modifying and directing Muscular Movement, independently of Volition", Royal Institution of Great Britain, (Proceedings), 1852, (12 March 1852), pp. 147–53.
- Clarke, J.F., "A Strange Chapter in the History of Medicine", pp. 155–69 in Clarke, J.F., Autobiographical Recollections of the Medical Profession, J. & A. Churchill, (London), 1874.
- Coates, James (1904), Human Magnetism; or, How to Hypnotise: A Practical Handbook for Students of Mesmerism, London: Nichols & Co.
- Easton, M.G., Illustrated Bible Dictionary: And Treasury of Biblical History, Biography, Geography, Doctrine and Literature, T. Nelson, (London), 1893.
- Edmonston, W.E., The Induction of Hypnosis, John Wiley & Sons, (New York), 1986.
- Gauld, A., A History of Hypnotism, Cambridge University Press, 1992.
- Gauld, A., "Braid, James (1795–1860)", Oxford Dictionary of National Biography, Oxford University Press, 2004.
- Gravitz Melvin A., Gerton Manuel I. (1984). "Origins of the Term Hypnotism Prior to Braid". American Journal of Clinical Hypnosis. 27 (2): 107–10. doi:10.1080/00029157.1984.10402865. PMID 6393756.
- Hammond, D.C. (2013), "A Review of the History of Hypnosis Through the Late 19th Century", American Journal of Clinical Hypnosis, Vol. 56, No. 2, (October 2013), pp. 174–81. doi:10.1080/00029157.2013.826172
- Harte, R., Hypnotism and the Doctors, Volume II: The Second Commission; Dupotet And Lafontaine; The English School; Braid's Hypnotism; Statuvolism; Pathetism; Electro-Biology, L.N. Fowler & Co., (London), 1903.
- Kravis NM (October 1988). "James Braid's psychophysiology: a turning point in the history of dynamic psychiatry". The American Journal of Psychiatry. 145 (10): 1191–1206. doi:10.1176/ajp.145.10.1191. PMID 3048116.
- Kroger, William S., Clinical and Experimental Hypnosis in Medicine, Dentistry, and Psychology (Revised Second Edition), Lippincott Williams & Wilkins, (Philadelphia), 2008. ISBN 978-0781778022
- Livingstone, D., "Arsenic as a Remedy for the Tsetse Bite (Letter to the Editor, written at sea on 22 March 1858)", British Medical Journal, Vol. 1, No. 70, (1 May 1858), pp. 360–61.
- Noble, D., Elements of Psychological Medicine: An Introduction to the Practical Study of Insanity Adapted for Students and Junior Practitioners, John Churchill, (London), 1853.
- Philips, J.P. (1860) [pseud. of Durand de Gros, J.P.], Cours Théorique et Pratique de Braidisme, ou Hypnotisme Nerveux, Considéré dans ses Rapports avec la Psychologie, la Physiologie et la la Pathologie, et dans ses Applications à la Médecine, à la Chirurgie, à la Physiologic Expérimentale, à la Médecine legale, et à l’Education. Par le Docteur J. P. Philips, suivi de la relation des expériences faites par le Professeur devant ses élèves, et de élèves, et de Nombreuses Observations par les Docteurs Azam, Braid, Broca, Carpenter, Cloquet, Demarquay, Esdaile, Gigot-Suard, Giraud-Teulon, Guérineau, Ronzier-Joly, Rostan, etc. ("A Theoretical and Practical Course of Braidism, or Nervous Hypnotism considered in its various relations to Psychology, Physiology and Pathology, and in its Applications to Medicine, Surgery, Experimental Physiology, Forensic Science, and Education. By Doctor J.P. Philips, based on experiments conducted by the Professor in front of his pupils, and by his pupils, and the numerous observations by the Doctors Azam, Braid, Broca, Carpenter, Cloquet, Demarquay, Esdaile, Gigot-Suard, Giraud-Teulon, Guérineau, Ronzier-Joly, Rostan, etc."), J. B. Baillière et Fils, (Paris), 1860.
- Simpson, J., "Letter from Mr. Simpson on Hypnotism, and Mr Braid's Theory of Phreno-Mesmeric Manifestations", The Phrenological Journal, and Magazine of Moral Science, Vol. 17, No. 80, (July 1844), pp. 260–72.
- Sutton, C.W., "Braid, James (1795?–1860)", pp. 198–99 in Lee, S. (ed), Dictionary of National Biography, Vol. VI: Bottomley-Browell, Smith, Elder, & Co., (London), 1886.
- Tinterow MM (July 1993). "Satanic agency and mesmerism reviewed – James Braid". The American Journal of Clinical Hypnosis. 36 (1): 3–6. doi:10.1080/00029157.1993.10403032. PMID 8368194.
- Volgyesi F.A. (1952). "James Braid's Discoveries and Psycho-Therapeutic Merits". British Journal of Medical Hypnotism. 3 (4): 2–10.
- Weitzenhoffer, André Muller (2000), The Practice of Hypnotism (Second Edition), New York: John Wiley and Sons. ISBN 9-780-4712-9790-1
- Weitzenhoffer A.M., Gough P.B., & Landes J. (1959), "A Study of the Braid Effect: (Hypnosis by Visual Fixation)", The Journal of Psychology: Interdisciplinary and Applied, Vol.47, No.1 (January 1959), pp. 67–80. doi:10.1080/00223980.1959.9916309
- Williamson, W.C. (Williamson, A.C., ed.), Reminiscences of a Yorkshire Naturalist, George Redway, (London), 1896.
- Yeates, Lindsay B. (2005), An Account of Thomas Brown’s Philosophy of the Human Mind, (unpublished manuscript), School of the History and Philosophy of Science, Faculty of Arts and Social Sciences, University of New South Wales, Kensington, New South Wales, Australia.
- Yeates, Lindsay B. (2013), James Braid: Surgeon, Gentleman Scientist, and Hypnotist, Ph.D. Dissertation, School of History and Philosophy of Science, Faculty of Arts & Social Sciences, University of New South Wales, January 2013.
- Yeates, Lindsay B. (2018a), "James Braid (I): Natural Philosopher, Structured Thinker, Gentleman Scientist, and Innovative Surgeon", Australian Journal of Clinical Hypnotherapy & Hypnosis, Vol. 40, No. 1, (Autumn 2018), pp. 3–39.
- Yeates, Lindsay B. (2018b), "James Braid (II): Mesmerism, Braid’s Crucial Experiment, and Braid’s Discovery of Neuro-Hypnotism", Australian Journal of Clinical Hypnotherapy & Hypnosis, Vol. 40, No. 1, (Autumn 2018), pp. 40–92.
- Yeates, Lindsay B. (2018c), "James Braid (III): Braid’s Boundary-Work, M‘Neile’s Personal Attack, and Braid’s Defence", Australian Journal of Clinical Hypnotherapy and Hypnosis, Vol. 40, No. 2, (Spring 2018), pp. 3–57.
- Yeates, Lindsay B. (2018d), "James Braid (IV): Braid’s Further Boundary-Work, and the Publication of Neurypnology", Australian Journal of Clinical Hypnotherapy and Hypnosis, Vol. 40, No. 2, (Spring 2018), pp. 58–111.
- Yeates, Lindsay B. (2018e), "James Braid (V): Chemical and Hypnotic Anaesthesia, Psycho-Physiology, and Braid’s Final Theories", Australian Journal of Clinical Hypnotherapy and Hypnosis, Vol. 40, No. 2, (Spring 2018), pp. 112–167.
- Yeates, Lindsay B. (2018f), "James Braid (VI): Exhuming the Authentic Braid – Priority, Prestige, Status, and Significance", Australian Journal of Clinical Hypnotherapy and Hypnosis, Vol. 40, No. 2, (Spring 2018), pp. 168–218.
