= Ideomotor phenomenon =

Concept in hypnosis and psychological research

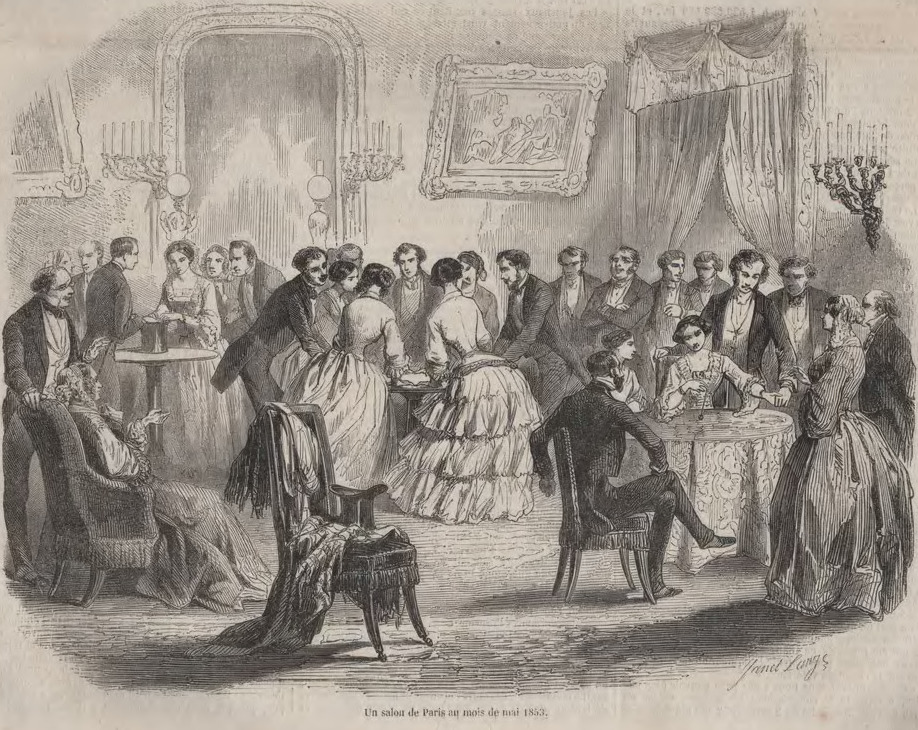
An example of table-turning in 19th century France. A circle of participants press their hands against a table, and the ideomotor effect causes the table to tilt in such a way as to produce a written message, in a manner similar to a ouija board.

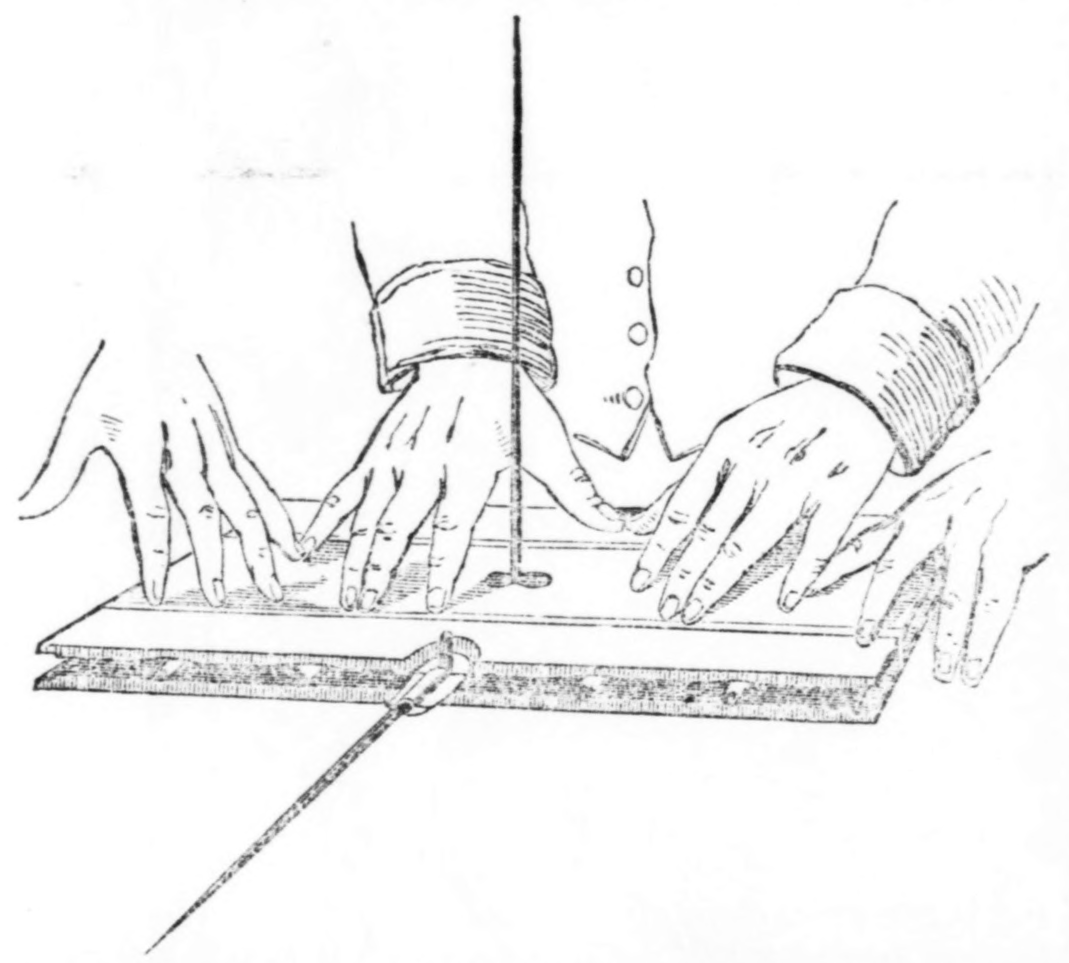
Faraday's apparatus for experimental demonstration of ideomotor effect on table-turning

The ideomotor phenomenon is a psychological phenomenon wherein a subject makes motions unconsciously. Also called ideomotor response (or ideomotor reflex) and abbreviated to IMR, it is a concept in hypnosis and psychological research. It is derived from the terms "ideo" (idea, or mental representation) and "motor" (muscular action). The phrase is most commonly used in reference to the process whereby a thought or mental image brings about a seemingly "reflexive" or automatic muscular reaction, often of minuscule degree, and potentially outside of the awareness of the subject. As in responses to pain, the body sometimes reacts reflexively with an ideomotor effect to ideas alone without the person consciously deciding to take action. The effects of automatic writing, dowsing, facilitated communication, applied kinesiology, and ouija boards have been attributed to the phenomenon.

The associated term "ideo-dynamic response" (or "reflex") applies to a wider domain, and extends to the description of all bodily reactions (including ideo-motor and ideo-sensory responses) caused in a similar manner by certain ideas, e.g., the salivation often caused by imagining sucking a lemon, which is a secretory response. The notion of an ideo-dynamic response contributed to James Braid's first neuropsychological explanation of the principle through which suggestion operated in hypnotism.

== History of scientific investigation ==
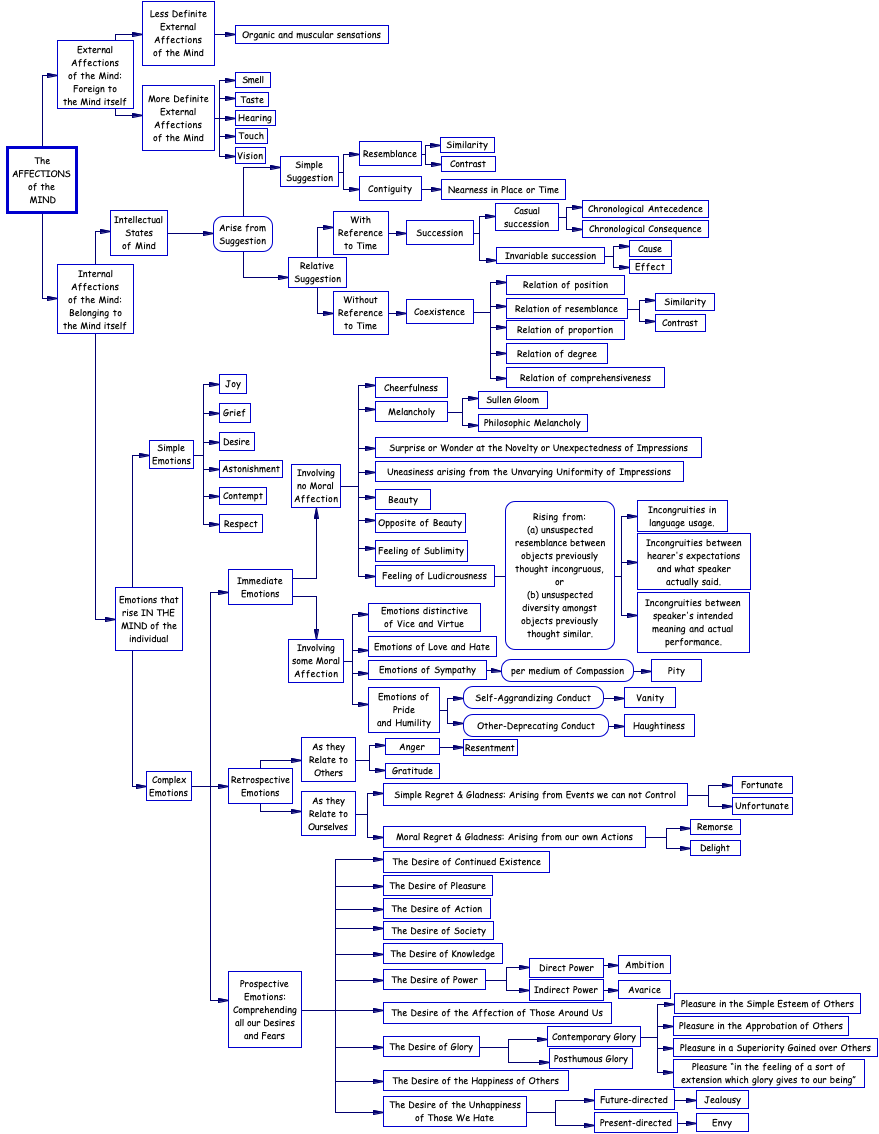
Brown's "Affections of the Mind", as discussed in his Lectures on the Philosophy of the Human Mind (Yeates, 2005, p.119).

With the rise of Spiritualism in 1840s, mediums devised and refined a variety of techniques for communicating, ostensibly, with the spirit world including table-turning and planchette writing boards (the precursor to later Ouija boards). These phenomena and devices quickly became the subject of scientific investigation.

The term ideomotor was first used by William Benjamin Carpenter in 1852. In a scientific paper that specifically discussed the means through which James Braid's "hypnotism" produced its effects, Carpenter derived the word ideomotor from the components ideo, meaning "idea" or "mental representation", and motor, meaning "muscular action". In the paper, Carpenter explained his theory that muscular movement can be independent of conscious desires or emotions; hence the alternative term "Carpenter effect".

Carpenter was a friend and collaborator of James Braid, the founder of modern hypnotism. Braid soon adopted Carpenter's ideo-motor terminology, to facilitate the transmission of his most fundamental views, based upon those of his teacher, the philosopher Thomas Brown, that the efficacy of hypnotic suggestion was contingent upon the subject's concentration upon a single (thus, "dominant") idea.

In 1855, Braid explained his decision to abandon his earlier term "mono-ideo-motor", based on Carpenter's (1852) "ideo-motor principle", and adopt the more appropriate and more descriptive term "mono-ideo-dynamic". His decision was based upon suggestions made to Carpenter (in 1854) by their friend in common, Daniel Noble, that the activity that Carpenter was describing would be more accurately understood in its wider applications (viz., wider than pendulums and ouija boards) if it were to denominated the "ideo-dynamic principle":

In order that I may do full justice to two esteemed friends, I beg to state, in connection with this term monoideo-dynamics, that, several years ago, Dr. W. B. Carpenter introduced the term ideo-motor to characterise the reflex or automatic muscular motions which arise merely from ideas associated with motion existing in the mind, without any conscious effort of volition. In 1853, in referring to this term, Daniel Noble said, "Ideo-dynamic would probably constitute a phraseology more appropriate, as applicable to a wider range of phenomena." In this opinion I quite concurred, because I was well aware that an idea could arrest as well as excite motion automatically, not only in the muscles of voluntary motion, but also as regards the condition of every other function of the body. I have, therefore, adopted the term monoideo-dynamics, as still more comprehensive and characteristic as regards the true mental relations which subsist during all dynamic changes which take place, in every other function of the body, as well as in the muscles of voluntary motion.

Scientific tests by the English scientist Michael Faraday, Manchester surgeon James Braid, the French chemist Michel Eugène Chevreul, and the American psychologists William James and Ray Hyman have demonstrated that many phenomena attributed to spiritual or paranormal forces, or to mysterious "energies", are actually due to ideomotor action. Furthermore, these tests demonstrate that "honest, intelligent people can unconsciously engage in muscular activity that is consistent with their expectations". They also show that suggestions that can guide behavior can be given by subtle clues (Hyman 1977).

Some operators claim to use ideomotor responses to communicate with a subject's "unconscious mind" using a system of physical signals (such as finger movements) for the unconscious mind to indicate "yes", "no", "I don't know", or "I'm not ready to know that consciously".

A simple experiment to demonstrate the ideomotor effect is to allow a hand-held pendulum to hover over a sheet of paper. The paper has words such as "yes", "no", and "maybe" printed on it. Small movements in the hand, in response to questions, can cause the pendulum to move towards the words on the paper. This technique has been used for experiments in extrasensory perception, lie detection, and ouija boards. This type of experiment was used by Kreskin and has also been used by illusionists such as Derren Brown.

A 2019 study of automatic pendulum movements using a motion capture system showed that pendulum effect is produced when the fingers holding the pendulum generate an oscillating frequency close to the resonant frequency of the pendulum. At an appropriate frequency, very small driving movements of the arm are sufficient to produce relatively large pendulum motion.

== Uses ==
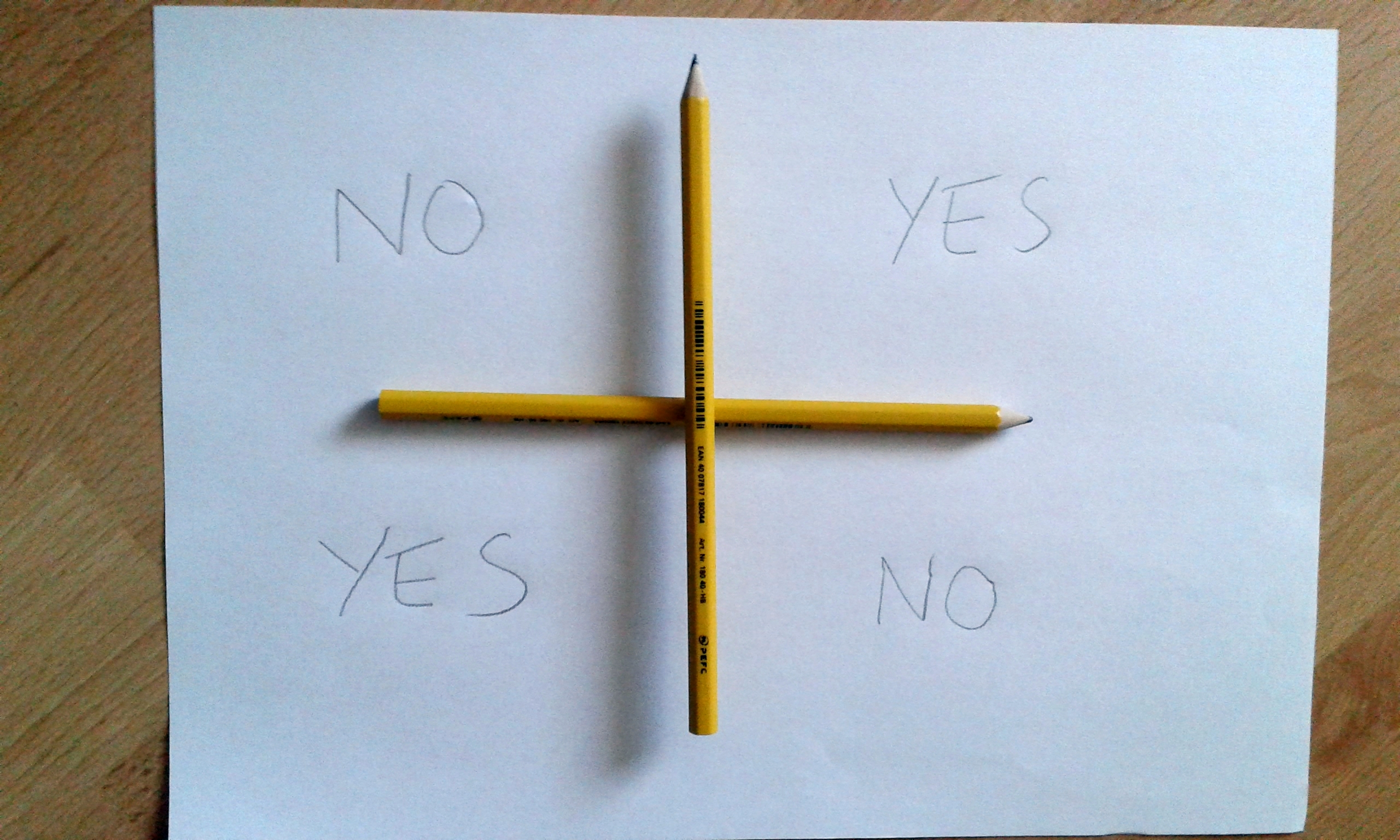
The Charlie Charlie challenge relies on the ideomotor phenomenon to produce answers to questions provided by its participants — the breathing from the participants anticipating a result causes the top pencil to rotate towards an answer

=== Responding to questions ===
It is strongly associated with the practice of analytical hypnotherapy based on "uncovering techniques" such as Watkins' "affect bridge", whereby a subject's "yes", "no", "I don't know", or "I don't want to answer" responses to an operator's questions are indicated by physical movements rather than verbal signals; and are produced per medium of a pre-determined (between operator and subject) and pre-calibrated set of responses.

== See also ==
- Adaptive unconscious – Psychological theory
- Alien hand syndrome – Neuropsychiatric disorder
- Bicameral mentality – Hypothesis in psychology
- Body language – Type of nonverbal communication
- Clever Hans – Horse who performed math tricks (1890s–1910s)
- Divided consciousness – Psychological state in which one's consciousness is split into distinct components
- Dual consciousness – Hypothetical concept in neuroscience
- Erasistratus – Greek anatomist and royal physician
- Illusions of self-motion – Misperception of one's location or movement
- Left-brain interpreter – Neuropsychological concept
- Proprioception – Sense of position of one's own body parts
- Subconscious – Part of the mind that is not currently of focal awareness
- Unconscious communication – Unconscious verbal and nonverbal cues
