= Charles Tuckey =

Charles Tuckey may refer to:

- Raymond Tuckey (Charles Raymond Davys Tuckey, 1910–2005), English tennis player
- Charles Lloyd Tuckey (1854–1925), English physician
- Charles Wilson Tuckey (born 1935), Australian politician
