= John Milne Bramwell =

British physician (1852–1925)

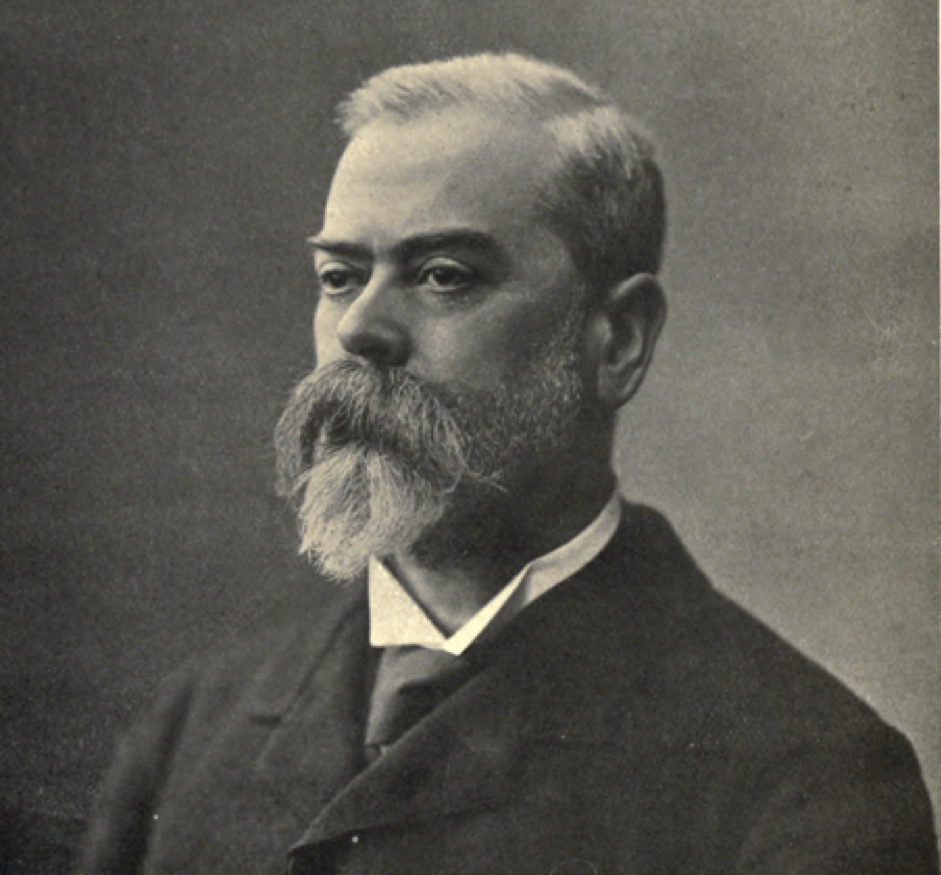
- Bramwell in 1905
- Born: 11 May 1852; Perth, Scotland
- Died: 16 January 1925 (aged 72); Ospedaletti, Kingdom of Italy
- Education: University of Edinburgh
- Known for: Hypnotism, hypnotherapy
- Scientific career
- Fields: Medicine, hypnotism

John Milne Bramwell (11 May 1852 – 16 January 1925) was a Scottish physician, surgeon and specialist medical hypnotist. He was born in Perth and educated at the University of Edinburgh.

== Early and personal life ==
The fourth child and youngest son of James Paton Bramwell (1824–1890), chief consulting surgeon at the Perth Royal Infirmary and Eleanor Bramwell, née Oliver (1821–1901), John Milne Bramwell was born in Perth, Scotland, on 11 May 1852.

One of his sisters, Elizabeth Ida Bramwell (1858–1940), became famous in Canada as the suffragette Ida Douglas-Fearn.

A second sister, Eleanor Oliver Bramwell (1861–1923), married Frank Podmore (1855–1910), psychical researcher, member of the Society for Psychical Research and founding member of the Fabian Society.

He married Mary Harriet Reynolds (c. 1851 – 27 May 1913) — the eldest surviving daughter of Captain Charles Sheppard Reynolds (1818–1853), formerly of the 49th Regiment, Bengal Native Infantry, and Assistant-Commissioner of the Assam Provinces, and Jessie Bramwell, née Blanch (1825–?), who had been born in Assam, India — at St. John the Evangelist Church, at East Dulwich, on 6 July 1875.

They had two children: Mary Eleanor Oliver Bramwell (c.1876-?) and Elsie Dorothy Constant, née Bramwell (1880–1968).

He died on 16 January 1925 at the Miramare Palace Grand Hotel in Ospedaletti, Italy.

== Education ==
Educated at Perth Grammar School and Edinburgh University, he graduated M.B. C.M. (Medicinae Baccalaureus, Chirurgiae Magister) at Edinburgh University in 1873, in the same cohort as Charles Braid (1850–1897), the grandson of James Braid.

== Medical practice ==
When Bramwell graduated from Edinburgh University, the Liverpool, Brazil, and River Plate Steam Ship Company appointed him as a surgeon. In the year that he worked for them, he made three return trips to Brazil.

Then, for a short time, he was assistant-surgeon at the Perth City and County Infirmary, before he moved to Goole in Yorkshire, where he worked as a general practitioner, in partnership with Malcolm Morris (1847–1924) FRCS (Edinburgh) and later with the noted dermatologist Sir Malcolm Morris KCVO of St Mary's Hospital, London.

Bramwell continued to practise in Goole for sixteen years until his interest and skills in hypnotism drew him to London in November 1892 where he became a highly respected specialist in medical hypnotism.

== Hypnotism ==
History of my own Practice

"My first introduction to the subject was indirectly due to James Esdaile. As we
have seen, after leaving India he lived for some time in my native town, Perth,
and many of his experiments were seen and afterwards reproduced by my father,
the late Dr. J. P. Bramwell. These experiments, which as a boy I witnessed from
time to time, deeply impressed me; and reproduced I eagerly devoured such books
on the subject as my father possessed, notably Dr. Gregory's Animal Magnetism
and a translation of Reichenbach's work.
When a student at Edinburgh, my attention was again drawn to hypnotism by
Professor John Hughes Bennett. A résumé of Braid's work and theories formed a
regular part of his course of physiology, and he confidently asserted that one day
hypnotism would revolutionise the theory and practice of medicine.
Soon after leaving Edinburgh I became busily engaged in general practice, and
hypnotism was almost forgotten until I learned that it had been revived in the wards
of the Salpêtrière. Of the methods and theories in vogue there I knew nothing, but
determined, if opportunity occurred, to go to Paris to study them. Before this chance
arrived, however, a case occurred in my own practice in which hypnotic treatment was
apparently indicated. Although I told my patient how little I knew of the subject, I had
no difficulty in hypnotising him. My success encouraged me to persevere – at first
cautiously amongst personal friends, and then more and more boldly amongst my
patients in general.
On March 28th, 1890, I gave a demonstration of hypnotic anæsthesia to a
large gathering of medical men at Leeds. This was reported in the British Medical
Journal and the Lancet, and, in consequence, so many patients were sent to me
from different parts of the country that I decided to abandon general practice, and
to devote myself to hypnotic work.
As I was well aware of the fate that had awaited earlier pioneers in the same
movement [viz., hypnotism], I naturally expected to meet with opposition and mis-
representation. These have been encountered, it is true; but the friendly help
and encouragement received have been immeasurably greater. I have also had
many opportunities of placing my views before my professional brethren, both
by writing and speaking, opportunities all the more valued because almost always
unsolicited. My interest in hypnotism has brought me in contact with many medical
men in other countries, and I owe a debt of gratitude for the kindness and courtesy
invariably shown me by those whose cliniques I have visited in France, Germany,
Belgium, Sweden, Holland, and Switzerland. …"

His father had seen James Esdaile (1808–1859) at work and, as a child, Bramwell had seen his father replicate Esdaile's mesmeric experiments.

While studying medicine at Edinburgh University, he was influenced by John Hughes Bennett (1812–1875), author of The Mesmeric Mania of 1851, With a Physiological Explanation of the Phenomena Produced (1851), who revived Bramwell's interest in hypnotism.

On 28 March 1890, Bramwell gave a public demonstration in Leeds of the use of hypnotism for dental and surgical anæsthesia.

He travelled widely in Europe and visited most of the important centres of hypnotism. He also directly observed the work of Hippolyte Bernheim (1840–1919) in Nancy, Jean-Martin Charcot (1825–1893) at the Salpêtrière in Paris, Frederik Willem van Eeden (1860–1932) and Albert Willem van Renterghem (1846–1939) in Amsterdam, Ambroise-Auguste Liébeault (1823–1904) in Nancy and Otto Georg Wetterstrand (1845–1907) in Stockholm, at their respective clinics.

Bramwell, who had visited Charcot, the famous French neurologist, founder of the "Hysteria School" at the Salpêtrière hospital in Paris, characterised Charcot and his work as a throwback to mesmerism.

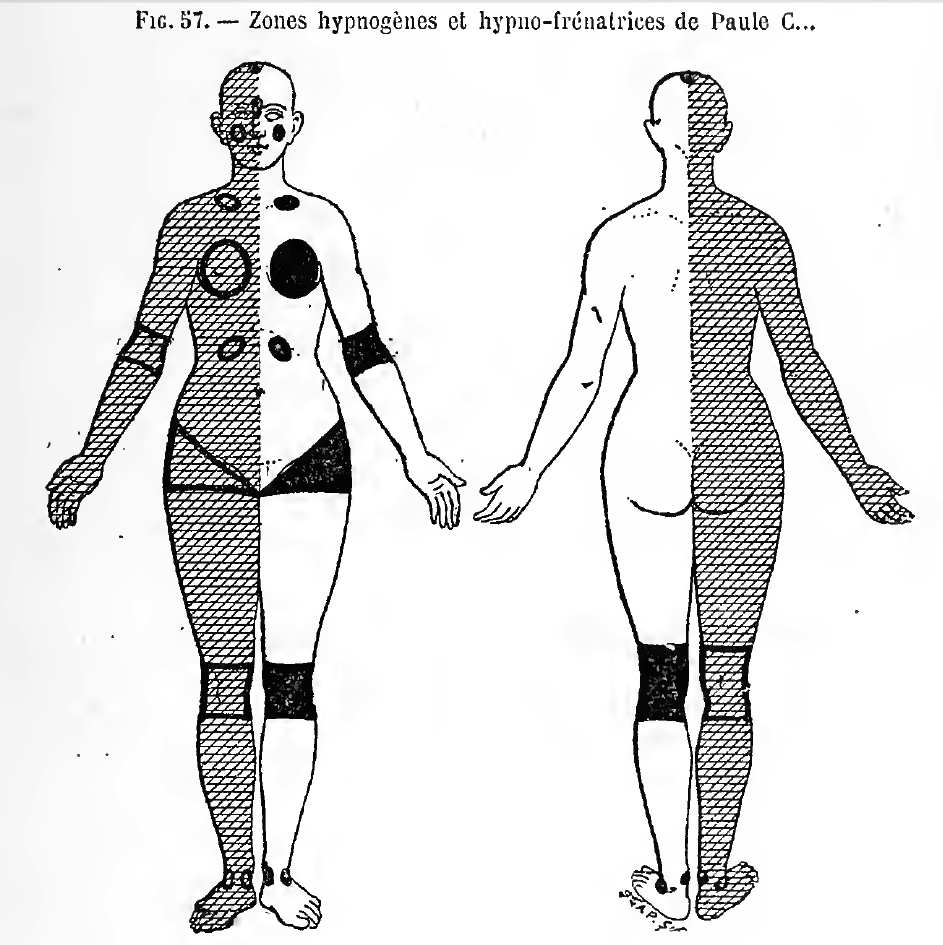
Pitres' 1884 diagram of the 'hypnogenetic zones' and 'hypno-arresting zones' on his patient, "Paule C—"

Around 1885, an associate of Charcot, Albert Pitres, another famous French neurologist at the Salpêtrière hospital, in a throwback to phreno-mesmerism, went even further, claiming that he had discovered zones hypnogènes, or "hypnogenetic zones" which, he said, when stimulated threw people into the hypnotic state, and zones hypnofrénatrices or "hypno-arresting zones", which, when stimulated, abruptly threw people out of that same hypnotic state (Pitres, 1891, passim).

Bramwell also visited Nancy on two occasions. From his observations and discussions there he felt that Hippolyte Bernheim and Ambroise-Auguste Liébeault had done little except reproduce Braid's earliest findings. Bramwell was also certain that they knew nothing about Braid's later developments of his theories and practices, his amended terminology and his mature understanding of the applications of hypnotic suggestion. In Bramwell's view, the theoretical position that Braid held at the end of his life (viz., 1860) was considerably more advanced than anything that was promoted by the "Suggestion School" in Nancy thirty-five years later.

In the history of hypnotism, especially in reference to its development from mesmerism, there are several facts which ought never to be forgotten.

Elliotson and Esdaile, however mistaken in their theories, were far in advance of their fellows.
Amid much that was false, they had discovered genuine phenomena, and investigated them in a scientific spirit, and successfully employed their knowledge for the relief of pain and the cure of disease.
Further, we shall see, when dealing with theories, that their fallacies and mistakes were reproduced in an exaggerated form by Charcot and his disciples.
Braid did not destroy mesmerism root and branch, and substitute hypnotism as something totally distinct in its place.
He might rather be said to have taken over the business of his predecessors, to have written off as valueless much of what they regarded as assets, and to have reconstructed a company on new lines.

[Braid's] views, too, as already mentioned, underwent constant change and development; and I hope to show, when discussing hypnotic theories, that he ended by holding opinions which are far in advance of those generally accepted at the present day.
Bramwell, Hypnotism, etc. (1903), p.39.

Along with other members of the Society for Psychical Research, such as Henry Sidgwick (1838–1900), William James (1842–1910), Frederic Myers (1843–1901), Charles Lloyd Tuckey (1854–1925), Eleanor Sidgwick (1845–1936), Edmund Gurney (1847–1888) and Arthur Myers (1851–1894) — Gurney and the two Myers brothers had visited both the Salpêtrière and Nancy in 1885 — Bramwell made a thorough scientific investigation of hypnotism and hypnotic phenomena and, through his lectures, public demonstrations, research and publications did much to increase knowledge of the potential of hypnotism, especially as an effective form of medical intervention.

== Promoter and defender of the heritage of James Braid ==
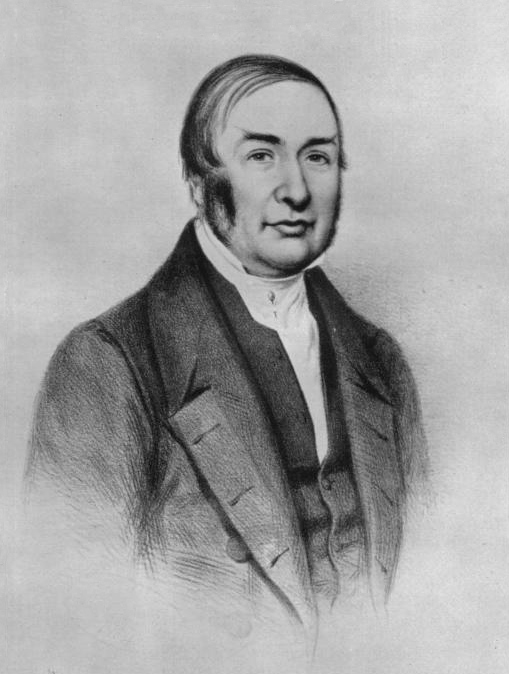
James Braid (1795–1860).

A medical hypnotist and hypnotherapist in his own right, Bramwell made a deep study of the works of James Braid, the founder of hypnotism, and helped to revive and maintain Braid's legacy in Great Britain.

Bramwell had studied medicine at Edinburgh University in the same student cohort as Braid's grandson, Charles. Consequently, due to his Edinburgh studies, especially with Bennett, he was very familiar with Braid and his work; and, more significantly, through Charles Braid, he had access to publications, records, papers, etc. of Braid that were still held by the Braid family. He was, perhaps, second only to Preyer in his wide-ranging familiarity with Braid and his works.

In 1896 Bramwell noted that, "[Braid's name] is familiar to all students of hypnotism and is rarely mentioned by them without due credit being given to the important part he played in rescuing that science from ignorance and superstition". He found that almost all of those students of hypnotism believed that Braid "held many erroneous views" and that "the researches of more recent investigators [had] disproved [those erroneous views]".

Finding that "few seem to be acquainted with any of [Braid's] works except Neurypnology or with the fact that [Neurypnology] was only one of a long series on the subject of hypnotism, and that in the later ones his views completely changed", Bramwell was convinced that this ignorance of Braid, which sprang from "imperfect knowledge of his writings", was further compounded by at least three "universally adopted opinions"; viz., that Braid was English (Braid was a Scot), "believed in phrenology" (Braid did not), and "knew nothing of suggestion" (when, in fact, Braid was its strongest advocate).

The mistaken view that Braid knew nothing of suggestion – and that the entire 'history' of suggestive therapeutics began with the Nancy "Suggestion" School in the late 1880s – had been widely promoted by Hippolyte Bernheim:

The difference between Braid and the Nancy School, with regard to suggestion, is entirely one of theory, not of practice. Braid employed verbal suggestion in hypnosis just as intelligently as any member of the Nancy school.
This fact is denied by Bernheim, who says: "It is strange that Braid did not think of applying suggestion in its most natural form – suggestion by speech – to bring about hypnosis and its therapeutic effects. He did not dream of explaining the curative effects of hypnotism by means of the psychical influence of suggestion, but made use of suggestion without knowing it."
This statement has its sole origin in [Bernheim's] ignorance of Braid's later works…
[Unlike Bernheim, Braid] did not consider [verbal] suggestion as explanatory of hypnotic phenomena, but… [he] looked upon it simply as an artifice used in order to excite [those phenomena].
[Braid] considered that the mental phenomena were only rendered possible by previous physical changes; and, as the result of these, the operator was enabled to act like an engineer, and to direct the forces which existed in the subject's own person. (Bramwell, 1903, pp.338-339)

In 1897, Bramwell wrote on Braid's work for an important French hypnotism journal ("James Braid: son œuvre et ses écrits").

He also wrote another article for the same journal on hypnotism and suggestion, strongly emphasizing the importance of Braid and his work ("La Valeur Therapeutique de l'Hypnotisme et de la Suggestion").

In his response to Bramwell's article, Bernheim repeated his entirely mistaken view that Braid knew nothing of suggestion (""A propos de l'étude sur James Braid par le Dr. Milne Bramwell, etc."). Bramwell's response ("James Braid et la Suggestion, etc.") to Bernheim's misrepresentation was emphatic:

"I answered [Bernheim], giving quotations from Braid's published works, which clearly showed that he not only employed suggestion as intelligently as the members of the Nancy school now do, but also that his conception of its nature was clearer than theirs" (Hypnotism, etc. (1913), p.28).

== Publications ==
Bramwell's publications include:

- Successful Treatment of Dipsomania, Insomnia, etc., and Various Diseases by Hypnotic Suggestion (1890–92).
- Hypnotic Anæsthesia (1896).
- On the Appreciation of Time by Somnambules (1896).
- "James Braid: His Work and Writings", Proceedings of the Society for Psychical Research, Vol.12, Supplement, (1896), pp. 127–166.
- "Personally Observed Hypnotic Phenomena", Proceedings of the Society for Psychical Research, Vol.12, Supplement, (1896), pp. 176–203.
- "James Braid: Surgeon and Hypnotist", Brain, Vol.19, No.1, (1896), pp.90-116.
- "On the Evolution of Hypnotic Theory", Brain, Vol.19, No.4, (1896), pp.459-568.
- Suggestion: Its Place in Medicine and Scientific Research (1897).
- "James Braid: son œuvre et ses écrits [James Braid: His Work and Writings]", Revue de l'Hypnotisme Expérimentale & Thérapeutique, Vol.12, No.1, (July 1897), pp.27-30; No.2, (August 1897), pp.60-63; (September 1897), pp.87-91.
- "La Valeur Therapeutique de l'Hypnotisme et de la Suggestion [The Therapeutic Value of Hypnotism and Suggestion]", Revue de l'Hypnotisme Revue de l'Hypnotisme, Vol.12, No.5, (November 1897), pp.129-137.
- "James Braid et la Suggestion: Réponse à M. le Professeur Bernheim (de Nancy) par M. le Dr. Milne-Bramwell (de Londres) [James Braid and Suggestion: A Response to Professor Bernheim (of Nancy) from Dr. Milne-Bramwell (of London)]", Revue de l'Hypnotisme Expérimentale & Thérapeutique, Vol.12, No.12, (June 1898), pp.353-361.
- Hypnotic and Post-hypnotic Appreciation of Time: Secondary and Multiplex Personalities, Brain, Vol.23, No.2, (1900), pp.161-238.
- "Hypnotism: An Outline Sketch – Being a Lecture delivered before the King's College Medical Society", The Clinical Journal, Vol.20, No.3, (Wednesday, 7 May 1902), pp.41-45; No.4, (Wednesday, 14 May 1902), pp.60-64.
- Hypnotism: Its History, Practice and Theory, Grant Richards, (London), 1903.
- Hypnotism: Its History, Practice and Theory (Second Edition), De La More Press, (London), 1906.
- Hypnotism and Treatment by Suggestion (1910).
- Hypnotism: Its History, Practice and Theory (Third Edition), William Rider & Son, (London), 1913.
