= William S. Kroger =

American physician

- Born: William Saul Kroger; April 14, 1906; Evanston, Illinois, U.S.
- Died: December 4, 1995 (aged 89); Cedars-Sinai Medical Center, Los Angeles, California, U.S.
- Resting place: Forest Lawn Memorial Park
- Education: Northwestern University; Feinberg School of Medicine (MD)
- Occupation: Physician
- Years active: 1960–1986
- Known for: Pioneering the use of hypnosis in medicine
- Father: Charles Mendel Kroger

William Saul Kroger (April 14, 1906 – December 4, 1995) was an American physician who pioneered the use of hypnosis in medicine and was co-founder and founder of medical societies and academies dedicated to furthering psychosomatic medicine and medical hypnosis.

Though he was trained as a gynecologist/obstetrician, his contributions to the medical field cut across disciplines and specialties in the medical field, including psychiatry, psychosomatic illness and treatment, endocrinology, neurobiology and bioengineering as well as his own specialty of gynecology and obstetrics.

He is the author of the medical textbook Clinical and Experimental Hypnosis, considered to be a classic instructional aid in the use of hypnosis in medical settings, as well as co-authoring Psychosomatic Gynecology, Including Problems of Obstetrical Care and Hypnosis and Behavior Modification: Imagery Conditioning, among others.

== Early life ==
Kroger was born in Evanston, Illinois.

Kroger's interest in hypnosis began at an early age when his father, Charles Mendel Kroger, hired a local hypnotist to generate publicity for his fur store. The hypnotist deeply hypnotized his assistant, then buried and awoke her. This inspired him to attempt to hypnotize other children in his neighborhood at age 13.

== Education ==
Kroger attended Northwestern University and received his pre-medical degree in 1926.

After receiving his bachelor's degree, he joined a psychoanalytic study club, which became the Chicago Institute for Psychoanalysis and underwent his own analysis.

He received his medical training at the Feinberg School of Medicine at Northwestern University, obtaining his Doctor of Medicine in 1930. He pursued his interest in psychotherapy by taking coursework and pursued an expertise in analytic concepts under the direction of Sigmund Freud's student and founder of psychosomatic medicine, Franz Alexander.

== Professional life ==
Kroger demonstrated the use of hypnosis on a breast surgery procedure on closed-circuit television for a national meeting of anesthesiologists in the removal of a benign growth and on another occasion in 1956 in Edgewater Hospital. Time magazine, which was covering the latter meeting, wrote an article about Kroger's use of hypnosis.

A week earlier, he had performed the same procedure on another patient in Chicago who had an enlarged and overactive thyroid. Kroger carried out the "hypnoanesthesia" at Edgewater Hospital, where the patient's thyroid was removed in an hour-long operation. Following the surgery and after being de-hypnotized, the patient stood up from the gurney, asked for a sip of water and walked to her wheelchair to return to her room. She is quoted as saying, "I felt no pain. I could only feel pressure and what seemed like tugging at my throat."

The procedure was captured for the first time in the film Thyroidectomy Under Hypoanesthsia. Kroger also participated in anesthetizing an expectant mother in Hypnosis in Obstetrics, which was also the first occasion on which hypnotism's use in delivery was filmed. Both educational movies were intended as teaching aids at medical schools, hospitals and scientific meetings and were produced by Wexler Films (now out of business). The first film was rereleased and included on DVD with the second edition of Clinical & Experimental Hypnosis. The text, featuring an introduction by Michael D. Yapko, is a republication of the second edition, originally printed in 1977; the first edition was published in 1963. He also produced the medical film Hypnosis in Dentistry.

An early member and co-founder of the Society for Clinical and Experimental Hypnosis (SCEH), a professional hypnosis society for researchers founded in 1949, Kroger later co-founded the American Society of Clinical Hypnosis with Milton H. Erickson, which included clinicians into their ranks. He was also founder of the Institute for Comprehensive Medicine and the International Society for Comprehensive Medicine, and the Academy of Psychosomatic Medicine.

Kroger organized and conducted multiple-day teaching seminars at major medical schools and medical societies from 1950 to the 1980s.

The journal Psychosomatics was launched during his tenure as head of the Academy of Psychosomatic Medicine, and he served as its associate editor. Kroger was also the associate editor of Mind; consulting editor of The Journal of Sex Research; advisory editor of the International Journal of Clinical and Experimental Hypnosis; associate editor of Existential Psychiatry and consulting editor of the Western Journal of Surgery, Obstetrics and Gynecology where he wrote a guest column entitled "Psychosomatics and Hypnosis".

His textbook, Clinical and Experimental Hypnosis, was described as being a "definitive textbook on the subject" and defined and shaped the field of hypnosis for over 20 years after its publication. Through the text and his own seminars put on by the ASCH, he changed the perception of hypnosis as being a novelty to a legitimate and respected medical option.

Kroger was a faculty member of the University of Illinois College of Medicine and also practiced privately. However, his use of hypnosis in medical practice was not accepted by the medical community. He later became an associate professor at the Chicago Medical School in 1950. Later, he was involved in the establishment of the Psychosomatic Clinic at Mt. Sinai Hospital in Chicago and became its first director. During this time he advanced his knowledge of endocrinology and neurobiology. The integration of his research and experience led to a collaboration with co-author S. Charles Freed in Psychosomatic Gynecology, Including Problems of Obstetrical Care, a textbook which argued that hypnosis had a place and merit in the medical field. It was reviewed by many medical journals and praised as an authoritative work and an instant classic.

Kroger wrote 13 books and more than 200 journal articles, as well as contributing forewords and introductions to books on the subject of hypnosis. His scientific exhibits, Hypnotherapy in Obstetrics and Gynecology, and Hypnotherapy in General Practice, have been held by the American Medical Association, the American Academy of General Practice (twice by invitation), the American College of Obstetricians and Gynecologists, the American Psychiatric Association and others.

== Involvement with law enforcement ==
In 1979, Kroger wrote Hypnosis in Medical Investigation with Richard C. Douce. an FBI special agent and psychology doctoral candidate. Kroger had been consulted on the use of hypnosis in ongoing investigations, and was asked by the FBI to evaluate the quality of information obtained through hypnosis in producing leads.

One of the cases Kroger and Douce study in the article is the 1976 Chowchilla kidnapping. The FBI asked Kroger to question a school bus driver who was kidnapped along with 26 children. Under Kroger's hypnosis, the driver was able to recall all but one of the digits on the kidnappers' car's license plate, and the kidnappers were subsequently convicted.

Kroger taught and trained FBI agents in hypnosis techniques and assisted in more than 30 cases, sometimes in conjunction with the FBI's Behavioral Analysis Unit. He also consulted for the Los Angeles Police Department and other law enforcement agencies in the investigation of major crimes.

== Private practice ==
Kroger maintained a private practice in Beverly Hills and Palm Springs, California from 1960 until his retirement in 1986.

== Death ==
Kroger died at Cedars-Sinai Medical Center in Los Angeles, California on December 4, 1995.

== Books and journal articles ==
Kroger authored 13 books which include:

- Psychosomatic Gynecology, Including Problems of Obstetrical Care (with S.C. Freed), 1951.
- Kinsey's Myth of Female Sexuality (with E. Bergler), 1954.
- Psychosomatic Obstetrics, Gynecology and Endocrinology: Including Diseases of Metabolism, 1961.
- Childbirth with Hypnosis (with J. Steinberg), 1961.
- Clinical and Experimental Hypnosis, 1963.
- Hypnosis and Behavior Modification: Imagery Conditioning (with William D. Fezler), 1976.

He contributed the chapters "Hypnosis in Obstetrics" and "Hypnosis in Gynecology" in Prior's System of Obstetrics and Gynecology and to other books.

Kroger has also authored over 200 articles in medical journals such as the Journal of the American Medical Association, the American Journal of Obstetrics and Gynecology, the American Journal of Psychiatry and The Journal of Sex Research.

== Awards ==
- 1954 - Third prize for an exhibit on hypnosis at the meeting of the American College of Obstetricians and Gynecologists.
- 1959 - Award of Merit for program chairman of the most successful annual meetings of the Society for Clinical and Experimental Hypnosis.
- 1963 - Certificate of Merit for best book on hypnosis, Clinical and Experimental Hypnosis.
- 1965 - The Society of Clinical and Experimental Hypnosis' Shirley R. Schneck Award "For a physician who has made significant contributions to the development of hypnosis".
