= Daniel Noble (physician) =

British physician (1810–1885)

Daniel Noble (14 January 1810 – 9 February 1885) was an English physician. A friend of surgeon James Braid, he is known for his contributions to the study of mental illness and epidemic diseases.

== Biography ==
He was a Roman Catholic, born 14 January 1810, the son of Mary Dewhurst and Edward Noble of Preston, Lancashire, a descendant of a Yorkshire Catholic family. Apprenticed to a Preston surgeon named Thomas Moore, Noble was in time admitted a member of the Royal College of Surgeons of England and a licentiate of Apothecaries Hall. In 1834, he began to practise in Manchester, becoming a specialist in mental illness.

Noble was President of the Manchester Phrenological Society from 1835 to 1838 but had turned away from the subject by the early 1840s, a time that coincided with his rise in social and professional status and also the general realisation that phrenology was unlikely ever to be accepted by the British Association for the Advancement of Science.

In 1842, he wrote the anonymous article titled "True and False Phrenology" in the aftermath of an address of seismic proportions, given by William Collins Engledue in 1842, that significantly split the Phrenological Association and led to Noble's own resignation from it.

Noble dropped phrenological ideas completely in 1846 after criticism from William Benjamin Carpenter, who favoured the theory of brain physiology. That criticism came in a review of Noble's Brain and Its Psychology and his renunciation was formally recorded in his Elements of Psychological Medicine, published in 1853.

Noble's views on mental illness influenced the terminology introduced by Henry Monro.

On 9 February 1847, Noble assisted his friend, Manchester surgeon James Braid, to (successfully) conduct a mastectomy, using inhalation ether as an anaesthetic agent. Braid was, perhaps, one of the first thirty surgeons in the U.K. ever to use inhalation ether as an anaesthetic.

Noble died at Manchester on 12 January 1885, aged 75.

== Works ==
- An Essay of the Means, physical and moral, of estimating Human Character 1835
- Facts and Observations relative to the influence of manufactures upon health and life 1843
- Mesmerism true, mesmerism false: A critical examination of the facts, claims, and pretensions of animal magnetism 1846
- The Brain and its Physiology, a critical disquisition of the methods of determining relations subsisting between the structure and functions of the encephalon 1846
- Elements of Psychological Medicine: an Introduction to the practical study of Insanity 1853-1855
- Three Lectures on the Correlation of Psychology and Physiology 1854
- The Human Mind in its relations with the Brain and Nervous System 1858
- On certain popular fallacies concerning the production of epidemic diseases 1859
- On the fluctuations in the death-rate 1863
- Evanescent Protestantism and Nascent Atheism, the modern religious problem 1877
- On causes reducing the effects of sanitary reform 1878.

== Family ==
In 1840 Noble married Frances Mary Louisa Ward, of Dublin. They had eight children, one of them Frances Noble the novelist, author of Gertrude Mannering (1875).

Professional and academic associations
Preceded by C. J. Richson	President of the Manchester Statistical Society; 1859–61	Succeeded by Edward Herford
