= Étienne Eugène Azam =

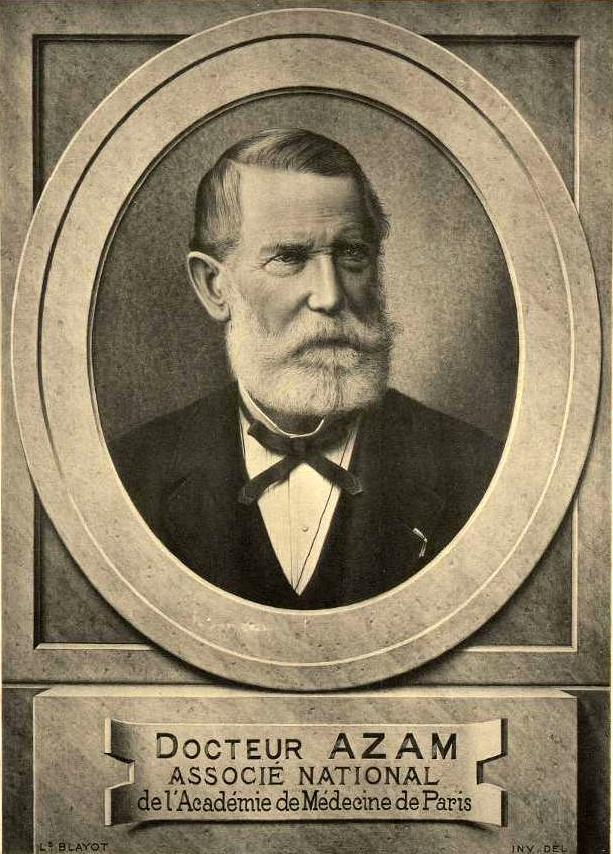
Doctor Azam

Étienne Eugène Azam (28 May 1822 – 16 December 1899), full name Charles-Marie-Étienne-Eugène Azam, was a French surgeon from Bordeaux who is chiefly remembered for his work in psychology, particularly a case involving a female patient he named "Félida X" who seemed to have "alternating personalities", or what Azam referred to as "dédoublement de la personnalité".

Over a number of years Azam studied Félida's psychological profile and published three reports. He described Félida as a hysterical patient who had a serious and sad (normal) state, along with a merry and generous state. He analyzed these two states as two distinct, separate personalities that seemed to be unaware of the other.

The case of Félida X is one of the earliest documented descriptions of what would later be called a multiple personality disorder. At the time, this situation garnered interest in the medical community, and created several puzzling questions regarding self-concept, as well as the definition of personal ego. Additionally from a quasi-religious context, the concept of multiple personalities was contrary to the paranormal belief system of spiritualism, which had a large following in the 19th century.

== Selected work ==
- Hypnotisme, double conscience et altérations de la personnalité : le cas Félida X,, preface by Jean-Martin Charcot, 1887
  - Hypnotisme, double conscience et altérations de la personnalité: le cas Félida X (Hypnotism, double consciousness, and personality changes: the case Félida X), (1887); Étienne Eugene Azam, with an introduction by Serge Nicolas.
