= Charles Lloyd Tuckey =

English physician

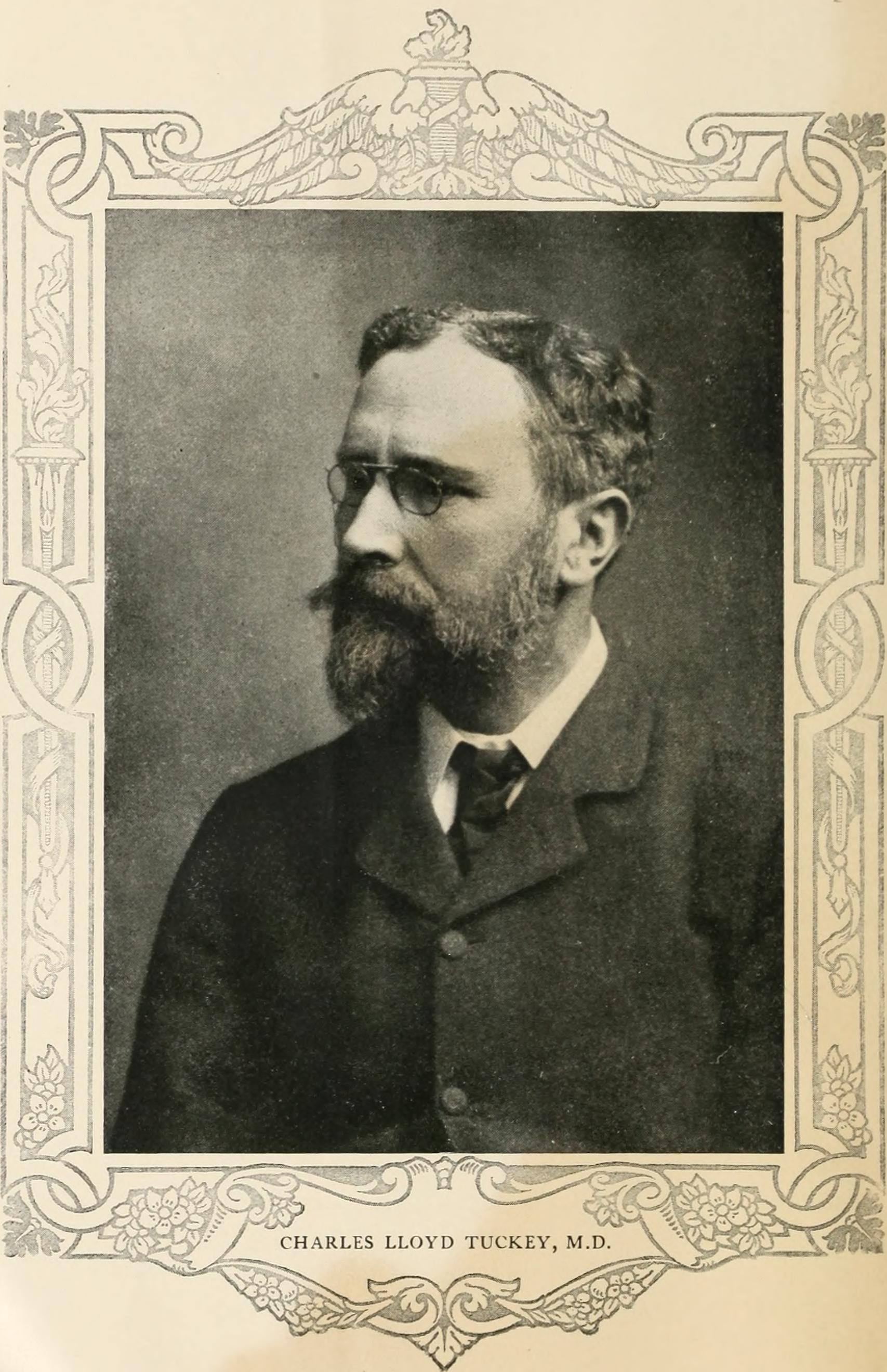
- Born: 14 February 1854; Canterbury, United Kingdom
- Died: 12 August 1925 (aged 71)
- Education: King's School, Canterbury
- Alma mater: King's College London, Aberdeen University
- Occupation(s): Physician, Hypnotherapist
- Known for: Reintroducing medical hypnotism to the United Kingdom
- Notable work: Psycho-Therapeutics: Treatment by Hypnotism and Suggestion

Charles Lloyd Tuckey (14 February 1854 – 12 August 1925) was an English physician, who with John Milne Bramwell, is widely credited with reintroducing medical hypnotism or hypnotherapy to the United Kingdom in the late nineteenth-century. He was born in Canterbury and educated at King's School, Canterbury before attending medical school at King's College London and Aberdeen University. He went on to practise medicine in London. In 1888, after visiting Ambroise-Auguste Liébeault in France and Drs Frederik van Eeden and Albert van Renterghem in Amsterdam he took up medical hypnotism despite its fringe status. He was a member of the New Hypnotists, a loosely knit group of British physicians who actively promoted medical hypnotism despite institutional opposition. Other members included John Milne Bramwell, Robert Felkin and George Kingsbury.

He wrote seven editions of the highly influential textbook, Psycho-Therapeutics: Treatment by Hypnotism and Suggestion between 1889 and 1920. He treated the American diarist Alice James using hypnotism for the pain and insomnia resulting from her breast cancer. He was a member of the Society for Psychical Research from 1889 to 1922, investigated hypnotic phenomena as chair of the organisation's Hypnotism committee and sat on the council from 1897 till his retirement.
