= Salpêtrière School of Hypnosis =

French school of psychotherapy from 1882

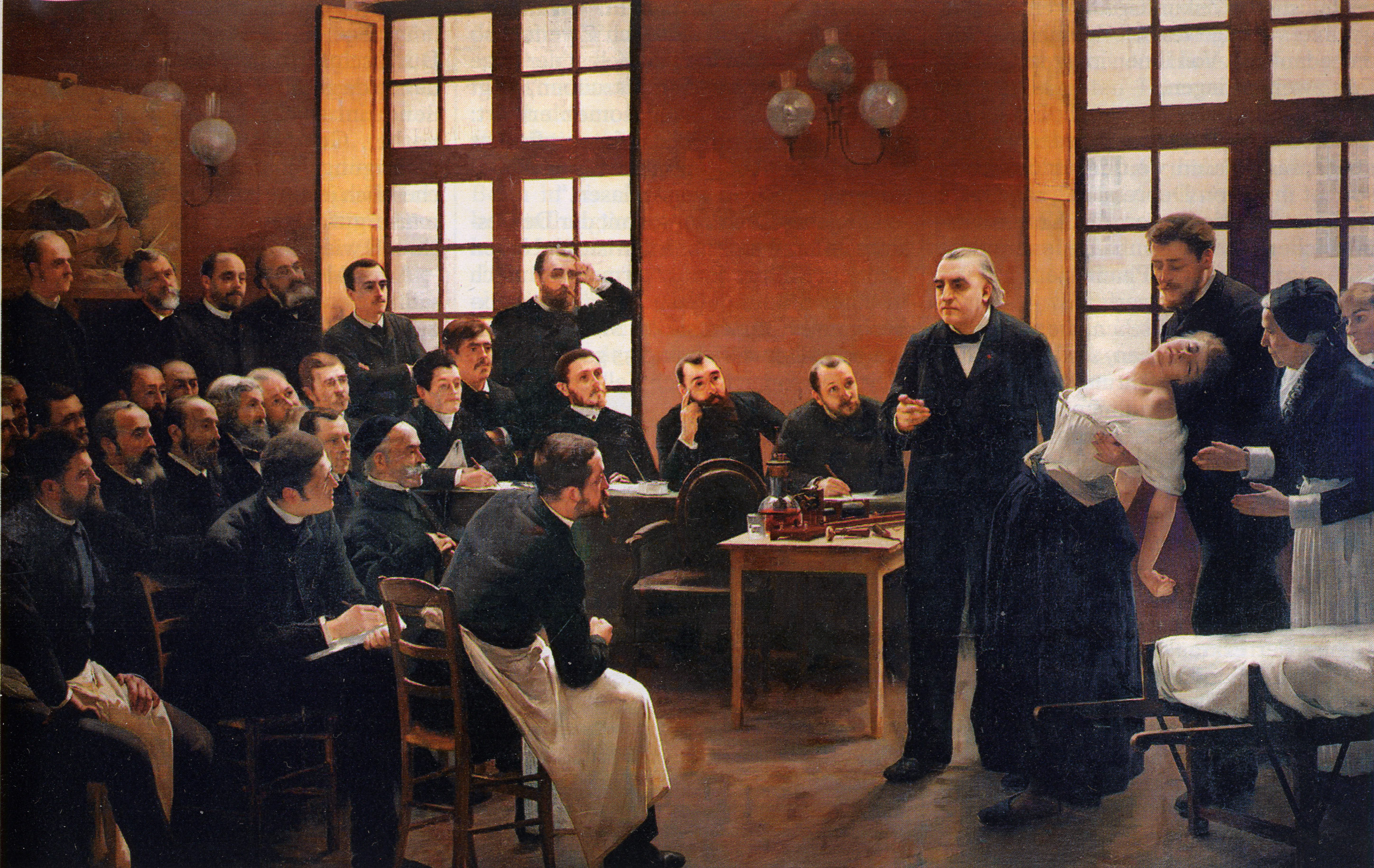
Charcot demonstrating hypnosis on a Salpêtrière patient, who is supported by Joseph Babiński

The Salpêtriére School, also known as the School of Paris, is, with the Nancy School, one of the schools that contributed to the age of hypnosis in France from 1882 to 1892. The leader of this school, the neurologist Jean Martin Charcot, contributed to the rehabilitation of hypnosis as a scientific subject presenting it as a somatic expression of hysteria. Charcot also used hypnosis as an investigative method and that by putting his hysterical patients into an "experimental state" it would permit him to reproduce their symptoms and interpret them.

Charcot did not consider people suffering from hysteria as pretenders and discovered that hysteria was not just a state reserved for women. Finally, Charcot associated hysteria to post-traumatic paralysis, establishing the basis for the theory of psychic trauma.

Charcot's collaborators included Joseph Babinski, Paul Richer, Alfred Binet, Charles Féré, Pierre Janet, Georges Gilles de la Tourette, Alexandre-Achille Souques, Jules Cotard, Pierre Marie, Gilbert Ballet, Paul Regnard, Désiré-Magloire Bourneville, Paul Brémaud and Victor Dumontpallier.

Ultimately, Charcot was accused of operating as a carnival showman, training his patients in theatrical behaviour, which he would attribute to hypnosis. After his death in 1893, the practice of hypnotism declined in medical circles.

The Salpêtrière and its Hysteria Ward have also served as inspiration for contemporary fiction. The 2024 historical novel The Madwomen of Paris by Jennifer Cody Epstein fictionalizes the experiences of women confined under Charcot’s care, exploring the medical and societal implications of hysteria and hypnosis in 19th-century France.

== Historical context ==
=== Animal magnetism and the emergence of hypnosis ===
Since the theoretical development of animal magnetism in 1773 by Franz-Anton Mesmer, the various movements of "magnetic medicine" fought into vain to be recognized and legitimized. In France, animal magnetism is introduced by Mesmer in 1778 and is the subject of several official condemnations, particularly in 1784, and in 1842 the Academy of Sciences decided to stop investigating magnetic phenomenon. That did not prevent a great number of doctors from using it, particularly in hospitals, including Charles-Nicolas d’Eslon (1750–1786), Jules Cloquet, Alexandre Bertrand, Professor Husson, Leon Rostan, François Broussais, Étienne-Jean Georget, Didier Berna and Alphonse Teste. In other European countries, animal magnetism was not subject to such harsh judgment, and was practiced by doctors such David Ferdinand Koreff, Christoph Wilhelm Hufeland, Karl Alexander Ferdinand Kluge, Karl Christian Wolfart, Karl Schelling, Justinus Kerner, James Esdaile, and John Elliotson.

The term "hypnotic" appears in the Dictionary of the French Academy in 1814 and the terms "hypnotism", "hypnosis", "hypnoscope", "hypnopole", "hypnocratie", "hypnoscopy", "hypnomancie" and "hypnocritie" are proposed by Étienne Félix d'Henin de Cuvillers on the basis of the prefix "hypn" as of 1820. The Etymological dictionary of the French words drawn from the Greek, by Morin; second edition by Guinon, 2 volume – 8°, Paris, 1809, and the universal Dictionary of Boiste, include the expressions "hypnobate", "hypnology", "hypnologic", "hypnotic".

It is generally accepted that in the 1840s, it's the Scottish surgeon James Braid who makes the transition between animal magnetism and hypnotism. In November 1841, Braid attends a public performance of the travelling French magnetic demonstrator Charles Lafontaine (1803–1892); and in 1843 Braid publishes Neurhypnology, Treaty of nervous sleep or hypnotism. Braid's hypothesis essentially repeats the doctrines of the French imaginist hypnotizers such Jose Custodio da Faria and Alexandre Bertrand. Braid criticizes Bertrand for explaining the magnetic phenomenon as caused by a mental state, the power of imagination, whereas he (Braid) explains them as being due to a physiological cause, the tiredness of the nerve centers related to the ocular apparatus. Above all, Braid's contribution consists of proposing a new method of fascination based on concentrating on a brilliant object, a method that supposedly produces more constant and more rapid effects compared to that of the old-fashioned magnetizers, and a theory based on the concept of mental fatigue. For him, hypnosis is a state of mental concentration during which the faculties of the patient's spirit are so entirely monopolized by one idea that it becomes indifferent to any other considerations or influence. Braid uses this method as an anesthetic during surgery. At that time, ether was not yet used in anesthesiology. Discovered in 1818 by Michael Faraday, ether is not used for the first time until 1846, by the American dentist William Morton.

Around 1848, Ambroise-Auguste Liébeault, a young surgery intern, also became interested in animal magnetism; and, influenced by the magnetic practices of Charles Lafontaine and Jules Dupotet de Sennevoy, he began putting young women to sleep. On December 5, 1859, the surgeon Alfred Velpeau presented to Academy of Sciences an intervention practised under hypnotic anaesthesia according to the method of Braid in the name of three young doctors, Étienne Eugène Azam, Paul Broca and Eugene Follin. The previous day at Necker hospital the three operated on an anal tumor using hypnotic anaesthesia. The operation, very painful by nature, occurred without the patient showing any sign of pain. The following year, using the nom de guerre "J.P. Philips", Joseph-Pierre Durand de Gros (1826-1900) published Cours Théorique et Pratique de Braidisme, ou Hypnotisme Nerveux, Considéré dans ses Rapports avec la Psychologie, la Physiologie et la la Pathologie, et dans ses Applications à la Médecine, à la Chirurgie, à la Physiologic Expérimentale, à la Médecine legale, et à l’Education ("A Theoretical and Practical Course of Braidism, or Nervous Hypnotism considered in its various relations to Psychology, Physiology and Pathology, and in its Applications to Medicine, Surgery, Experimental Physiology, Forensic Science, and Education").

In 1864, Liébeault moved to Nancy as a philanthropist healer, curing children with magnetized water and by the laying on of hands. His interest in animal magnetism was revived by reading the works of Crêpe and Azam. He is on the fringe at a time when animal magnetism was completely discredited by the academy when he publishes in 1866, to general indifference, Sleep and similar states considered especially from the point of view of the action of the moral on the physique.

In 1870, the philosopher Hippolyte Taine presented an introduction to the theories of Braid in his review Intelligence. In 1880, a neurologist of Breslau, Rudolf Heidenhain, impressed by the achievements of the public hypnotizer Carl Hansen, adopts his method and publishes a book on animal magnetism. In Austria, the neurologist Moritz Benedikt experiments with hypnosis, followed by the doctor Josef Breuer.

== See also ==
- A Clinical Lesson at the Salpêtrière – 1887 group tableau portrait by André Brouillet
- Animal magnetism – Pseudoscientific theory about force in living things
- Henri-Étienne Beaunis – French physiologist, psychologist, and founding member of the Nancy School of Hypnosis
- Hippolyte Bernheim – French physician, neurologist, and founding member of the Nancy School of Hypnosis
- Female hysteria – Outdated diagnosis for patients with multiple symptoms of a neurological condition
- History of hypnosis
- Hysteria – Excess, ungovernable emotion
- Ambroise-Auguste Liébeault – French physician and founding member of the Nancy School of Hypnosis
- Jules Liégeois – French jurist, academic, and founding member of the Nancy School of Hypnosis
- Pitié-Salpêtrière Hospital – Hospital in Paris, France
- Royal Commission on Animal Magnetism – 1784 French scientific bodies' investigations involving systematic controlled trials
- Suggestibility – Inclination to accept the suggestions of others
- Suggestion – Psychological process of guiding a person
- The Nancy School of Hypnosis – French school of psychotherapy from 1866
