= Jules Liégeois =

French jurist, academic, and founding member of the Nancy School of Hypnosis

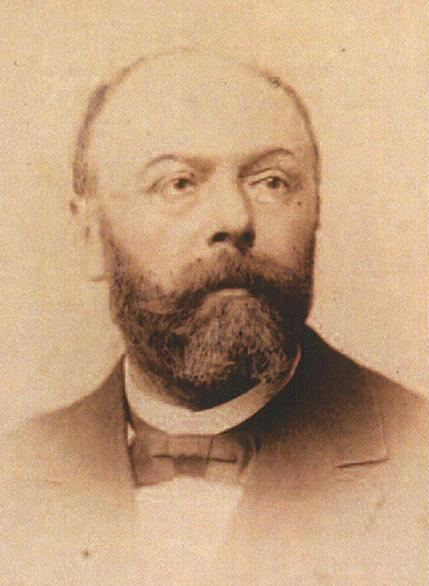
- Jules Liégeois (1891)
- Born: Jules Joseph Liégeois; 30 November 1833; Damvillers, France
- Died: 14 August 1908 (aged 74); Bains-les-Bains, France
- Occupations: Jurist; university professor; psychologist
- Known for: Administrative law; Political economy; Member of Nancy School; Hypnotic suggestion; Hypnotism and crime
- Spouse: Hélène Marie Henriette Peiffer
- Children: 2
- Awards: Knight of the Legion of Honour

Jules Joseph Liégeois (30 November 1833 – 14 August 1908), Knight of the Legion of Honour ("Chevalier de l'Ordre de la Légion d'Honneur"), was a French jurist who was also widely known as an important foundation member, promoter, and defender of the Nancy School of Hypnosis. He also was a professor of administrative law at the University of Nancy for forty years.

In addition to his numerous publications on administrative law and the relationship between economics and the law, he was recognized for the significance, scope, and systematic nature of his critical and innovative personal investigations into natural/spontaneous somnambulism, hypnotism, and hypnotic suggestion in the wider medico-legal domain. He "was the first forensic scientist to scientifically address the medical question of hypnotism", and "was the leading researcher in the nineteenth century into the possibilities of the abuse of hypnosis for the purposes of crime", not only in the sense of crimes committed upon a hypnotized subject, and those committed by a hypnotized subject, but also in the sense of the hypnotized subject having no memory of either their hypnotization or their subsequent activity, as a direct consequence of the hypnotist's suggestions.

"Besides doing successful work in economics, [Professor Jules Liégeois] has put both psychologists and jurists in his debt by his pioneer studies of hypnotism and suggestion in their medico-legal aspects." — The American Journal of Psychology (January 1910).

== Family ==
The son of Joseph-Martin Liégeois (1797-1854), a forester, and Anne-Rosalie Liégeois (1810-1890), née Tabutiaux, Jules Joseph Liégeois was born at Damvillers, Meuse, France on 30 November 1833.

He married Hélène Marie Henriette Peiffer (1842-1935) in Nancy on 25 September 1867; they had two children: Marie Marguerite Liégeois (1868-1897), who married the linguist and philologist Ferdinand Brunot in 1891, and Jules Albert Liégeois (1875-1930), who went on to become an examining magistrate in Évreux.

== Academic career ==
His first employment was in various administrative roles — first, in the Meuse Department, at Bar-le-Duc (1851 to 1854), and then in the Meurthe Department, at Nancy (1854 to 1863) — and it was not until he was in his late 20s that he began formal legal studies at Strasbourg (there was no University in Nancy at that time).

Having successfully submitted his bachelor's degree dissertation, Du prêt à intérêt en droit romain et en droit français ('Interest-bearing loans in Roman law and French law'), at the University of Strasbourg's Faculty of Law and Political Science in 1861, he went on to defend his doctoral dissertation, Essai sur l'histoire et la legislation de l'usure ('Essay on the History and Legislation of Usury'), at Strasbourg in 1863.

Personally appointed directly by Victor Duruy, the French Minister of Public Education (1863-1869), in October 1865, he served as professor of administrative law (as distinct from civil and criminal law) at Nancy University from the University's re-establishment in 1865 until his retirement in 1904, when he became an honorary professor.

He published widely upon important matters of public and administrative law — including two important works (1873b, 1882b), jointly written with Louis Pierre Cabantous (1812-1872), Professor of Administrative Law, and Dean of the Faculty, at Aix-Marseille University — and on political economy and the relationship between economics and public law, many of which displayed the influence of the economic theories of Frédéric Bastiat: e.g. 1858; 1861; 1863; 1865; 1867; 1873a; 1873b; 1873c; 1877; 1878; 1879; 1881a; 1881b; 1882a; 1882b; 1882c; 1883, and 1890a.

== The two French "Schools" of hypnotism (1882–1892) ==
It is significant that neither the "Salpêtrière School" (a.k.a. the "Paris School"), or "Hysteria School", nor the "Nancy School", or "Suggestion School", as they are widely known, were "Schools" in the classical sense; neither, for instance, had an undisputed "master". However, as Mathieu Touzeil-Divina (2024a) observes, whilst the members of each group displayed as many differences of approach between themselves as points of agreement (that is, apart from the Nancy School's agreed-upon views on hypnotism and suggestion, and their opposition to the views of Charcot and the Salpêtrière School), it is still useful to speak of the two groups as competing "schools of thought", on the basis that the members of each group shared entirely different geographic, thematic, and chronological linkages from those that were shared by the members of the other group; and, also, all the research and experimentation of each was conducted entirely independent of the other.

Peter (2024, p. 6) draws attention to the fact that, despite all of the subject-centred research conducted by a wide range of researchers with a wide range of theoretical orientations and disciplinary allegiances in the last 150 years into "[what] has always been regarded as a hallmark of hypnosis" — namely, "a non-judgemental, involuntary acceptance of suggestions", which, "[when] seen as a negative characteristic" is "a loss of control" — the question of "whether such a suggestive-hypnotically induced loss of control is also possible in normal everyday life, [and] whether the hypnotized person is then helplessly at the mercy of the hypnotist" has never been unequivocally settled.

=== "Hypnotism" and "hypnosis" ===
There is no objective evidence of any kind that the various allusions made by either of the Schools to "somnambulism", "artificial somnambulism", "hypnotism", or "hypnosis" were, in fact, speaking of the same psychological circumstances and physiological arrangements; and, so, the two may well have been "talking past each other", rather than engaging in an actual dispute.

=== Imagination ===
At the time of their (1784) inquiries, the two Royal Commissions on Animal Magnetism — one was from the Paris Faculty of Medicine) and the French Royal Academy of Sciences (i.e., Bailly, 1784a; 1800; 1784b), and the other from the Royal Society of Medicine of Paris (i.e., Poissonnier, et al., 1784) — independently and emphatically concluded from their controlled trials and "blind" experiments that the (metaphysical) claims made by Mesmer's former associate, Charles d’Eslon, for the substantial existence of "animal magnetism" (le magnétisme animal) and of a substantial (rather than metaphorical) "magnetic fluid" (le fluide magnétique) were nothing more than a case (as Mesmer himself had argued) of the inappropriate reification of metaphor (i.e, Alfred Whitehead's "fallacy of misplaced concreteness"), and were, therefore, entirely without foundation.

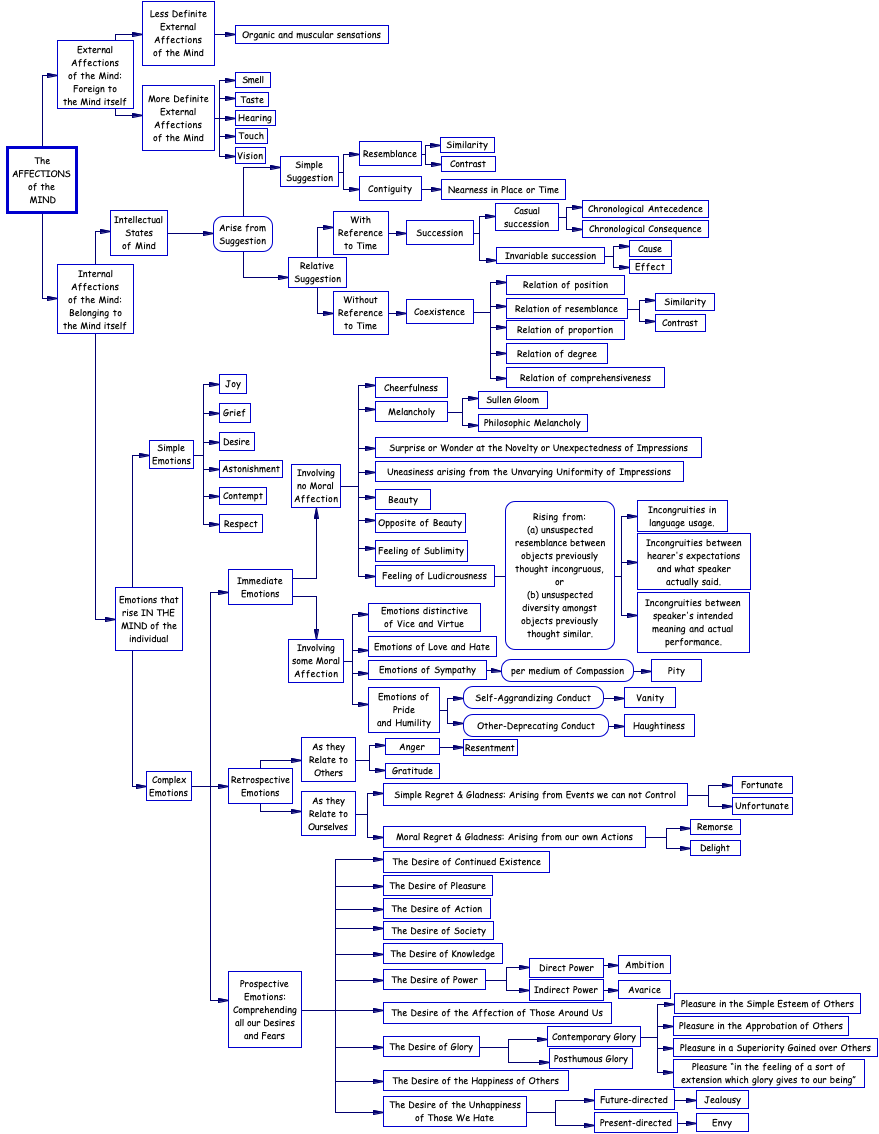
Brown's "Affections of the Mind", as discussed in his Lectures on the Philosophy of the Human Mind.

==== Dominant ideas ====
Anticipating the (c.1820) work of Thomas Brown, the Chair of Moral Philosophy at Edinburgh University, James Braid's teacher, in relation to the suggestive influence of "dominant ideas", and the work of Braid himself, in relation to the "mono-ideo-dynamic principle of action" concept (Braid, 1855) that he had developed from the work of his associates William Benjamin Carpenter, and Daniel Noble, both of the (1784) investigatory committees concluded that — having excluded any potential influence from either contact, or imitation — all of the observed phenomena could be attributed to the psycho-physiological agency of imagination.

==== Suggestion ====
It is significant that, a century later, and despite their significant differences in relation to "hypnotism", "hypnosis" etc. (see below), both Charcot (Salpêtrière School) and Bernheim (Nancy School) were united in their overall interest in "suggestion".

==== "Miracles" ====
Both Schools were entirely convinced that the so-called "miracles" — i.e., "counter-intuitive events" attributed to "counterintuitive agents" (Pyysiäinen, 2002) — reported to have taken place at Lourdes were entirely attributable to each individual pilgrim's "imagination" (see Charcot, 1892; and Bernheim, 1889, pp. 196-202); and, as well, as Charcot noted (1893, p.31), "the faith-cure demands special subjects and special complaints — those, namely, which are amenable to the influence of the mind over the body". In a similar vein, Beaunis, of the Nancy School, replicated the earlier work of Prof. Henri Bourru (1840-1914) and M. Prosper Ferdinand Burot (1849-1921) of the School of Naval Medicine, at Rochefort, in producing "stigmata" per medium of "suggestion" (Liégeois 1889a, pp. 294-299).

=== "Hysteria School of Hypnosis" at the Salpêtrière, Paris (fl.1878–1893) ===
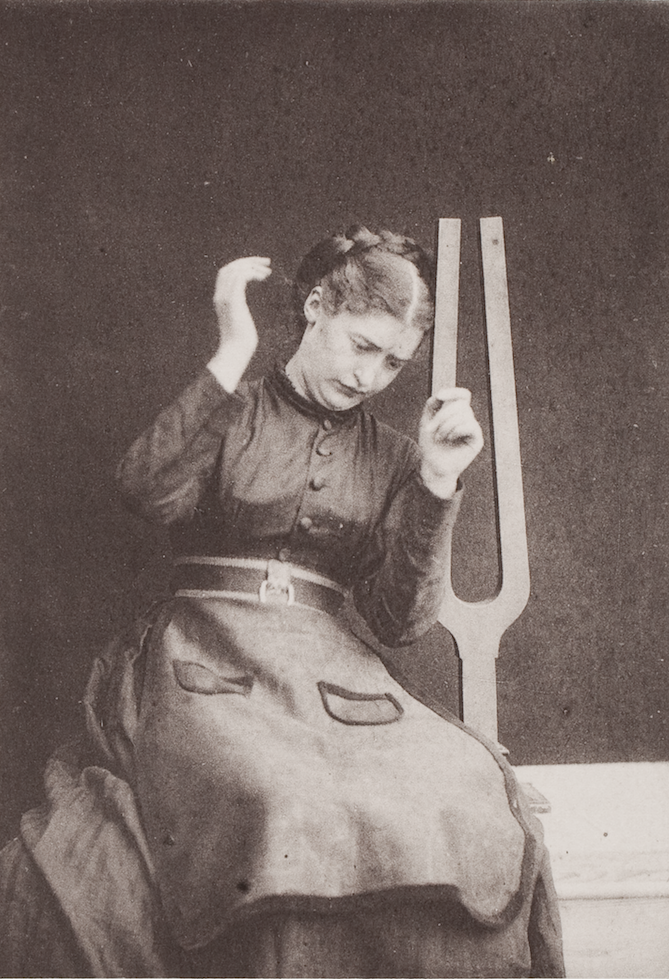
An experimental subject of Charcot manifesting catalepsy— produced by a tuning fork's sound (Iconography of the Salpêtrière).

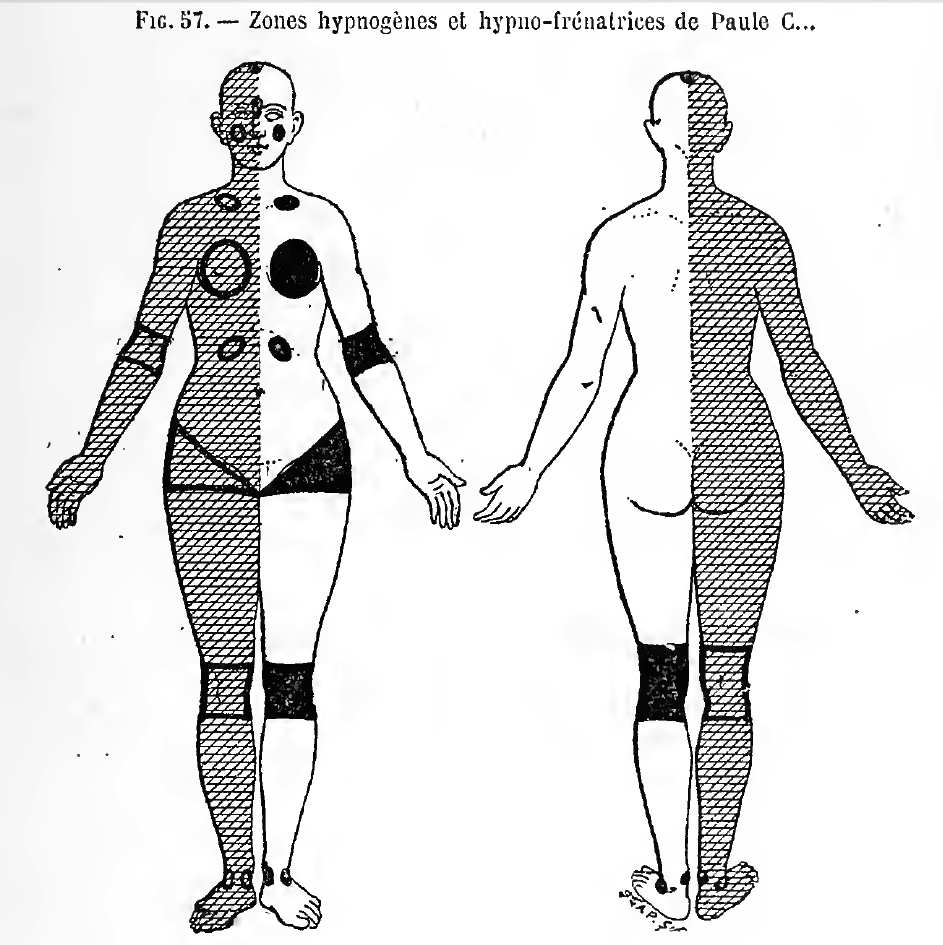
Pitres' (1891) diagram of his "hypnogenetic zones" (subject's left side) and "hypno-arresting zones" (subject's right side)

"At the very outset my studies dealt with hysterical women, and ever since I have always employed hysterical subjects. ... [and] I have chosen rather to deal almost always with the female sex, because females are more sensitive and more manageable than males in the hypnotic state." — Jean-Martin Charcot (January 1890).
"[Unlike Liébeault and Bernheim] Charcot never personally hypnotized any subject. The younger physicians worked with the subjects, and Charcot used them as demonstration subjects after they had learned what was expected of them and had seen other subjects perform. They were unwittingly trained by the physicians and by each other." — Frank Pattie (1967).
"One point that to me appears to be established by incontestable observations, is that the persons, whether men or women, who are susceptible of hypnotization, are nervous creatures, capable of becoming hysterical, if not actually hysterical at the beginning of the experiments. ... The training of the subjects is no easy thing and takes time; and besides, fit subjects are by no means so plentiful as some authors would have us believe." — Jean-Martin Charcot (April 1890).

The "Hysteria School", or "Salpêtrière School", was centred on the theories and practices of Jean-Martin Charcot, a neurologist at the Pitié-Salpêtrière Hospital in Paris. The procedures were used upon a very small, limited number of the female "hysteria" inpatients of the Pitié-Salpêtrière Hospital — i.e., as "hysteria" was understood at the time.

Members of the school held — given that its experimental subjects were all "hysteria" patients, perhaps mistaking correlation for causation — that "hypnosis" was an artificially produced pathological state similar to hysteria. From this, they also argued that, given the pathological nature of the hypnotic state, only medical/neurological professionals had the expertise required to avoid the potential dangers of its application: viz., that of "violently unleashing pathological states in persons of labile disposition" (Mayer, 2013, p. 104). The means of induction employed by Charcot's assistants included those derived from Braid's upwards and inwards squint, as well as wide range of auditory and tactile stimuli:

"[In relation to the means of hypnotization] Charcot's school at La Salpetiere has modified the Braid method, by placing pieces of glass close to the bridge of the nose, by which procedure the convergency of the eyes is increased and sleep comes more rapidly. A blow on a gong or a pressure on some "hypnogenic or hysterogenic" zone — such as an ovary, the top of the head, etc. (see: The "zones" of Albert Pitres) — or the app[r]oaching of a magnet will act on hysterical women." — Fredrik Johan Björnström (1887).

=== "Suggestion School of Hypnosis" at Nancy (fl.1864—1907) ===
Inspired by the theories and practices of the Nancy physician and medical hypnotist, Ambroise-Auguste Liébeault (1823–1904), who had already been independently working with hypnotism and "suggestion" for twenty-five years — delivering his hypnotic treatments to all and sundry free of charge — and united by their opposition to the "hysteria", views of Charcot and his followers at the Salpêtrière, those in the "Suggestion School" collectively held that (i) "hypnosis" was a state similar to sleep, (ii) it was not a diagnostic feature of "hysteria", (iii) it was produced by suggestion, (iv) that the capacity to be "hypnotized" was a normal, natural (and non-pathogenic) ability shared by all, and (v) that the well-attested efficacy of "suggestion", on its own, was significantly enhanced by "hypnotism".

"The hypnotic condition is not an abnormal one, it does not create new functions nor extraordinary phenomena; it develops those which are produced in the waking condition; because of a new psychical modality, it exaggerates the normal susceptibility to suggestion, which we all possess to some extent; our psychical condition is modified so as to carry out the images and impressions evoked with greater boldness and distinctness." — Hippolyte Bernheim (1888).
"Hypnotism, like natural sleep, exalts the imagination, and makes the brain more susceptible to suggestion. ... It is a physiological law, that sleep puts the brain into such a psychical condition that the imagination accepts and recognizes as real the impressions transmitted to it. To provoke this special psychical condition by means of hypnotism, and to cultivate the suggestibility thus artificially increased with the aim of cure or relief, this is the role of psychotherapeutics." — Hippolyte Bernheim (1888, emphasis in original).

Of the foundation members of "Suggestion School" — Prof. Jules Liégeois (faculty of Law), Prof. Hippolyte Bernheim (1840–1919) (faculty of Medicine), and Prof. Henri-Étienne Beaunis (1830–1921) (chair of Physiology), from the University of Nancy — the first to associate himself with the experiments, principles, and practices of Liébeault was the legal expert, Liégeois, "who had learned of Liébeault's practices by chance, and whose scientific curiosity had led him there", then, somewhat later, came the (initially sceptical) neurologist and physician, Bernheim, who had also learned of Liébeault's practices by chance, and, finally, initially persuaded by Bernheim, came the physiologist Beaunis, who had held the chair of Physiology at Nancy University ever since the University had moved from Strasbourg to Nancy in 1872.

In addition to their extensive personal experience of the successful hypnotization of a wide range of subjects in a wide range of circumstances, and their practical and theoretical studies of the phenomena of hypnotism and hypnotic suggestion in general, the members of the Nancy School also investigated the medical and legal aspects of their application: with Berheim concentrating on their therapeutic aspects, Liégeois on their (civil and criminal) legal aspects, and Beaunis on their physiological and psychological aspects.

== Liégeois, hypnotism and suggestion ==
Elementary Propositions of Hypnotism
(From the final version presented to the Belgian Senate by
the Belgian Royal Academy of Medicine, December 1891)

The Royal Academy of Medicine of Belgium, considering the disadvantages
and dangers of the popularized practice of hypnotism, has expressed the wish
that the Legislature enact provisions aimed at:
1. Prohibiting public performances of hypnotism; and
2. Preventing and punishing abuses that may result from the practice
of hypnotism.
It is in response to this motion that the Government has tabled a Bill sub-
mitted for our [viz. the Senate] deliberations.
The dangers that the popularization of hypnotism practices may pose, both
from a moral and public health perspective, cannot be seriously disputed. They
were recognized by the Royal Academy of Medicine after a lengthy discussion,
which ended with the unanimous vote on the motion mentioned above. ...
The scientific opinions expressed by the learned assembly during this
discussion are summarized in the following propositions:
"Hypnotism causes a disturbance of the mental faculties, the effect of which
is to deprive the patient of the use of free will, making him the passive agent
of the ideas suggested by the hypnotist;
"The patient unconsciously obeys the suggestions of the hypnotist; he is only
aware of and remembers them during hypnosis; the memory is erased for
him at the moment of awakening. The actions suggested by the hypnotist are
performed by the patient, as the hypnotist orders, either during hypnosis or
after awakening, at a more or less distant date;
"The patient acts and speaks under the impulse of the hypnotist's will, with all
the appearances of free and thoughtful spontaneity;
"The revelation of secrets that concern him personally or of which he is the
custodian can be imposed on the patient by the hypnotist; it can also occur
spontaneously through the sole influence of hypnosis;
"Even if we admit, which is doubtful, that the automatic passivity of the patient
does not always extend to yielding to all the suggestions of the magnetizer,
whatever they may be, it remains nonetheless certain that, in Deep Hypnosis,
the patient's entire organism is at the mercy of the magnetizer; master of his
senses, the magnetizer can exalt or suspend their activity and hallucinate them,
at will; master of his will, he can irresistibly impose on him the most ridiculous,
the most degrading, or the most criminal acts;
"The magnetizer, as he renews the hypnotic practices on the same patient,
progressively reinforces the domination he exercises over him and which he
seized the day he, for the first time, hypnotized him; he ends up subjugating
him to the point that resistance to the magnetic influence becomes impossible
and a word, a look, is enough to make him fall into hypnosis;
"Hypnotism exposes the patient to nervous breakdowns; it alters or weakens,
at the very least, his mental faculties;
"The sight of hypnotic phenomena presents dangers for those present,
provided they have a predisposition to nervous breakdowns."
The preceding statements, emanating from members of the leading medical
body in our country, spare us from entering into further considerations to justify
a Bill prohibiting public hypnotism sessions and prohibiting hypnotism practiced
on minors or other incapacitated persons by anyone other than a doctor. ...

— Report of the Justice Commission responsible for examining the
Hypnotism Bill: Senate Session of 15 December 1891 (Lammens, 1891).

"In this initial period ... Liégeois [rather than Bernheim] was the early worker, the most steadfast, the most militant, the most convinced [by Liébeault's work and "new method"]. He brought to the common cause the support of his moral authority, his character, his robust and active faith, which never wavered for a moment, and thanks to him, criminal legislation had to recognize and would increasingly deal with the phenomena of hypnotism and suggestion." — Henri-Étienne Beaunis (1909).
"Professor Liégeois's career ... is well known. I will confine myself to proclaiming, once again, that he was a true initiator. He was, in fact, the first to address the study of the relationship between hypnotism and law and jurisprudence. His studies were pushed so far in this direction that his name dominates the entire forensic study of hypnotism. It was in this capacity that he was called to the first international congress on hypnotism, in 1889, through his position as vice-president, to represent the legal experts. At the second congress, in 1900, he shared this honour with Mr. [Edmond] Melcot, Attorney General at the Court of Cassation ... [Admired for] his courage, energy, generosity, firmness in his carefully considered opinions, and consistency in his friendships ... his name will remain, in the history of hypnotism and psychology, indissolubly linked to that of Liébeault, with whom he was a faithful collaborator and to whom he brought, until the end, the comfort of his friendship." — Edgar Bérillion (1910).

The issue of Liégeois' ("outlier") non-medical profession was constantly raised in the ad hominem attacks made over the years by those seeking to belittle his research, theories, and influence; for instance, in his (1889) response to Liégeois' presentation, on the dangers of criminal suggestions, to the First International Congress of Experimental and Therapeutic Hypnotism (Liégeois, 1889b), Georges Gilles de la Tourette, expressed his disappointment (p. 264) that Liégeois, a Professor of Law, had not confined his presentation to the legal issues of the relationship between hypnotism and jurisprudence/forensic medicine, and had chosen, instead, to speak of a wide range of medical and physiological aspects of hypnotism.

However, despite being neither medical practitioner nor neurologist, Liégeois was far better known than Bernheim, or Beaunis, or Liébeault at the time of his five (April/May 1884) lectures to the French Academy of Moral and Political Sciences on hypnotism, suggestion, and crime, and their subsequent publication (Liégeois, 1884). He was also becoming increasingly recognized as a significant French authority on hypnotism and hypnotic suggestion; for instance, by August 1884 Le Monde illustré was referring to Liégeois as "the esteemed hypnotizing professor" ("L'estimable professeur hypnotisant").

=== "Waking" and "hypnotic" suggestion ===
Although Liégeois' initial experiments reflected his academic interest in the legal parallels between hypnotism and natural/spontaneous (i.e., rather than "mesmeric" or "artificially induced") somnambulism, his major work over an extended period involved a thorough investigation into the principles and practices responsible for a far wider range of applications of "suggestion" — involving both 'waking' suggestion and 'hypnotic' suggestion — than their medical and/or therapeutic applications alone.

In particular, given his forensic interest in the effects of "suggestion" and their significance in relation to issues of posthypnotic amnesia, and the personal responsibility/culpability for the phenomena produced by "suggestion", he was also deeply interested in the nature, form, and content of the "suggestions" made. Driven by his concern with the philosophical and forensic (rather than therapeutic) aspects of hypnotism and hypnotic suggestion, Liégeois asserted, along with Charcot's associate Pierre Janet (1920, pp.284–285), that the critical feature of the subject-operator interaction was not the operator's making of the "suggestion", but, instead, was the subject's taking of the "suggestion" made by the operator. As Yeates (2016a) observed, in the same way that "one is only a "hypnotist" if one induces "hypnotism" ... an idea is only a "suggestion" if it "suggests" something"(p. 35); and as Titchener (1910, p 450) noted, without knowing the subsequent response to its presentation, there is no objective a priori difference between a "suggestive idea" and any other idea; and, from this, Titchener argued, "suggestion" can not be a (before the yet-to-be performed event) "descriptive" term, but is only a (subsequent to the reactive event's occurrence) "explanatory" term.

Among the wide range of experiments Liégeois conducted, his subjects displayed responses to suggestions made at a distance in time (1886e) and at a distance in space (1886b, 1886c). He confirmed (1886e) the existence of what Berhheim described as les suggestions post hypnotiques à longue échéance ('post-hypnotic suggestions to be realised after a long interval'), when one of his subjects demonstrated a suggested result precisely 365 days (as demanded by Liégeois) after the relevant hypnotic suggestion had been delivered. He also demonstrated that subjects (i) could be hypnotised, and (ii) would respond to suggestions delivered to them over the telephone: and, in his report (1886b, p. 142; 1886c, p. 24), Liégeois also supposed that a similar outcome might be achieved by a phonograph recording.

=== Hallucinations ===
The work of French alienist Jacques-Joseph Moreau's (1845) Du Hachisch et de l'aliénation mentale — which spoke of the hallucinations induced by drugs (e.g., opium, hashish) in otherwise "normal" people — had begun to shift disciplinary consciousness away from the view that, "because hallucination was a verifiable feature of the behaviour of the insane, the phenomenon must in itself be pathological" (Finn, 2017, p. 22), towards one that accepted that a capacity to experience hallucination was a feature of an entirely normal "existence intérieure" ('inner/subjective existence') and an entirely normal "vie intrà-cérébrale" ('intracerebral life'):

"The hallucination ... encompasses all of the faculties of the mind; its only limits are those that nature has placed upon the activity of mental functions. In other words, all mental abilities can be hallucinated, and not just certain abilities, such as those connected with the perception, for example, of sounds or images." — Jacques-Joseph Moreau (1845).

Liégeois devoted an entire chapter of his 1889 work to the experiences of himself and others in relation to those hallucinations induced by hypnotic suggestion; namely, both:

- (a) "hallucinations positives", perception of some thing as being present in the absence of any related external stimulus; and
- (b) "hallucinations négatives", perception of some thing as absent in the actual presence of a specific, related external stimulus: i.e., the rationale behind the modern processes of hypnotic pain management.

== Liégeois, hypnotism and crime ==
As an academic and jurist Liégeois was interested in "the subject of personality modification and its implications in law" (Marchetti, 2015, p. 81) and, in particular, the legal questions raised in relation to "culpability", for instance, in the case of M. Emile X—, as it had been observed by Adrien Proust (father of Marcel Proust) the Inspector-General of the French Government Sanitary Service, and had been reported in the French press, "as to the possibility of anyone exercising such an influence over another person as to make him or her irresponsible for the acts committed under that influence, even though those acts may be crimes". Liégeois was especially interested in the extent to which it was possible that (otherwise innocent) subjects could be induced, by means of hypnotic suggestion, to commit crimes, thefts, and even murders. Gauld (1992, p.497) characterizes these events as "hypnotic crimes": namely, crimes wherein the hypnotic subject was both the "victim" and the "agent" of the crime — with the suggestion-delivering operator, rather than the suggestion-complying subject, being the actual "criminal". As Harris (1985, p. 486) notes, this view produced "unresolved tensions and ambiguities", because the Nancy School, "on the one hand [was] arguing that hypnotism had enormous potential to ameliorate previously intractable conditions, and on the other [was] regarding it as the possible motor for the committal of unspeakable crimes".

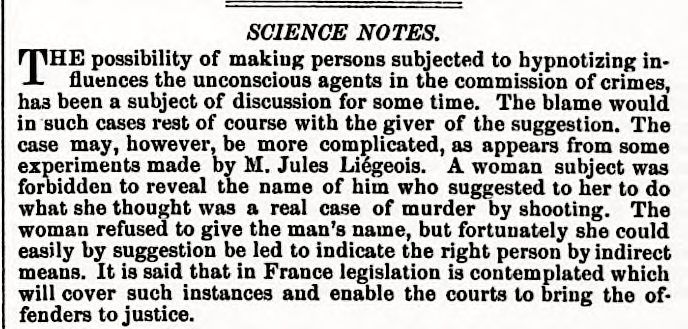
Report of Liégeois' experiments with hypnotic suggestion (The American, 20 October 1888).

"[In the mid-1880s, in addition to concerns relating to the possibility] of rape under hypnotic sleep ... another type of moral concern associated with hypnotism was gaining public attention abroad: the possibility of inciting people under hypnosis to commit criminal acts. It was Jules Liégeois, the French lawyer associated with the Nancy School of hypnotism, who in 1884 first pointed to this danger in a report for the French Academy of Moral and Political Sciences." — Kaat Wils (2017).

Liégeois' own experiments, relating to both serious and petty crimes, which employed a wide range of suggested "mock" activities involving fake weapons, fake poisons, etc. — i.e., "crimes expérimentaux" ('experimental crimes'), or "crimes de laboratoire" ('laboratory crimes), in place of "crimes véritable" ('real crimes') — was work for which he was much admired by the experimental psychologist, Joseph Delbœuf (e.g., Delbœuf, 1892), and much denigrated by Charcot's associate, Georges Gilles de la Tourette (e.g., Gilles de la Tourette, 1891b). However, as Bogousslavsky, Walusinski & Veyrunes (2009, pp. 197-198) observe, Gilles de la Tourette's criticism was somewhat unfair: not only had Gilles de la Tourette (some time earlier) personally conducted similar "hypnotic murder" experiments involving fake pistols and mock poisons at the Salpêtrière, but he had also reported them in detail in his 1887 work.

Notwithstanding the obvious fact that individuals, subjected to extended processes of incremental (non-hypnotic) suggestion, can be induced to self-harm (e.g., Peoples Temple suicides in Guyana in 1978, Heaven's Gate suicides in California in 1997, etc.) or coerced to commit a crime, most advocates of "hypnotic crimes" also recognized that the successful demonstration of an "experimental crime" did not, in and of itself, provide sufficient proof of the possible existence of an analogous "real crime"; for instance:

"It may be set down as an axiom in experimental hypnotism that no laboratory experiment conducted for the purpose of ascertaining whether suggestion can be successfully employed to induce an hypnotic subject to perpetrate a crime is of any evidential value whatever. When a subject is hypnotized for that purpose he knows that he is among friends. He knows that they are law-abiding citizens who will take care that no harm shall result from the experiments about to be made. He generally knows that he is expected to carry out all suggestions that are made to him. He is very probably aware that he is expected to demonstrate the truth of the proposition that a criminal hypnotist can compel his subject to commit crime. Like all hypnotic subjects he is anxious to win applause — to create astonishment. In short, he knows that he is the central figure in a comedy or farce which is about to be played in the interests of "science", and he feels that he is the "scientist". The inevitable consequence is that he resolves to carry out every suggestion of the hypnotist, knowing that no harm can possibly result." — Thomson Jay Hudson, LL.D., Ph.D., (1895, emphasis in original)

Liégeois' investigations culminated in his (1889a) magnum opus, "On suggestion and somnambulism in their relation to jurisprudence and legal medicine" — based upon the experience and observations he had accumulated since his earlier, five full-session presentation to the Académie des Sciences Morales et Politiques in April and May 1884 (Liégeois, 1884) — which concentrated in great detail upon the legal implications of hypnotism, hypnotic phenomena, and hypnotic suggestion, arguing that, in cases of hypnotic crime, only the person who gave the suggestions was guilty and must be prosecuted and punished, whilst the (irresponsible) hypnotised person should be acquitted on the grounds that they were nothing more than "a simple instrument", just like the pistol that contains a bullet, or a vase that contains poison: however, as Laurence & Perry (1988) observe, it must be stressed that those within the Nancy School "did not believe that everyone could fall victim of criminal suggestion", and held the view that "only deeply hypnotizable subjects ... were generally at risk".

== Gabrielle Bompard ==
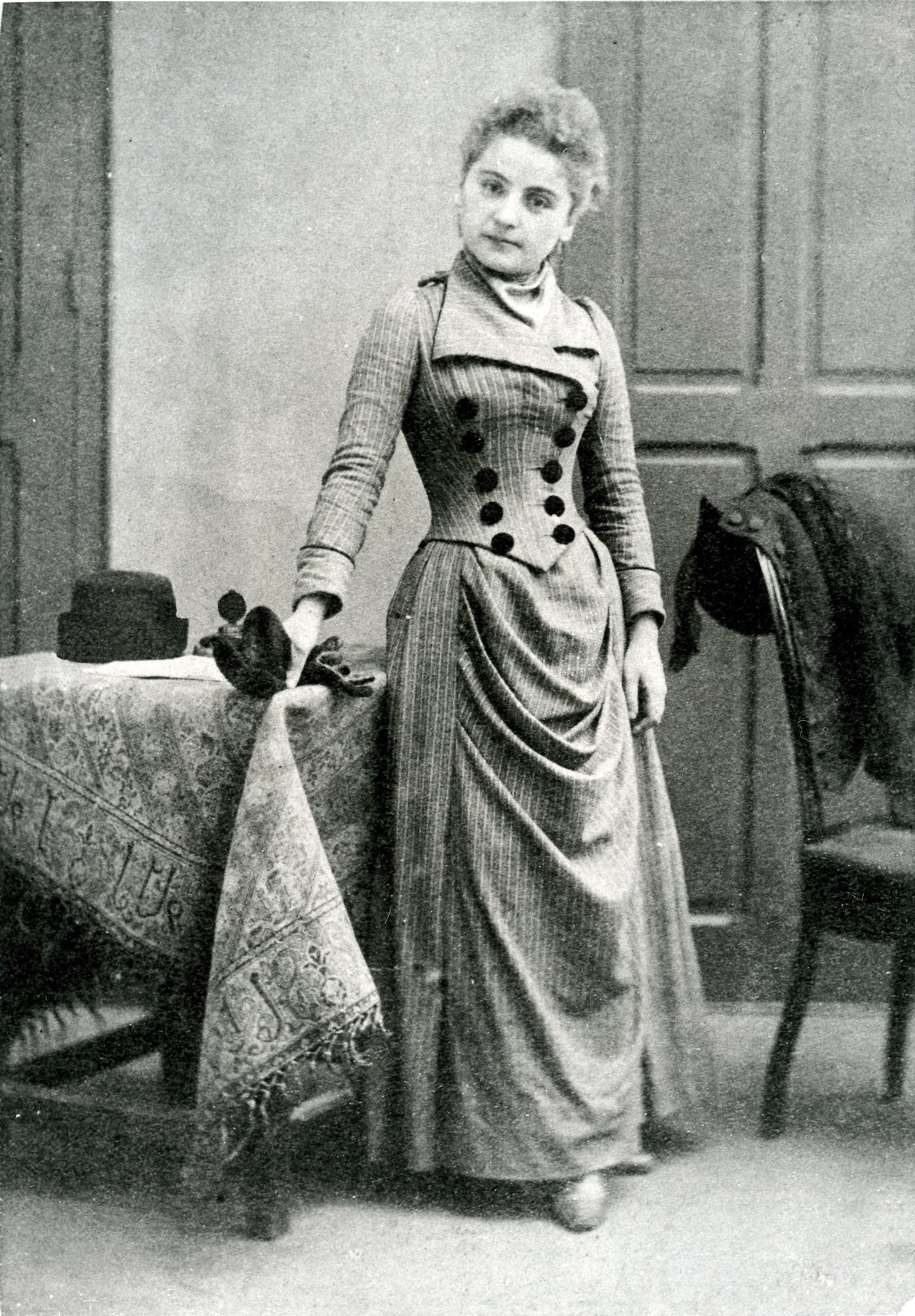
Gabrielle Bompard (c.1891)

"There can be no crime, or delict, where the accused was in a state of madness, at the time of the action; or when he has been constrained by a force which he had not the power to resist." — Article 64: French Penal Code of 1810.

In December 1890, Michel Eyraud, aged 47, and Gabrielle Bompard, aged 21, were jointly tried in Paris for the (July 1899) murder of Toussaint-Augustin Gouffé — "the prosecution's case was that Bompard, in association with her middle-aged lover Michel Eyraud, had willingly allowed herself to be used as a sexual bait to lure Alexandre-Toussaint Gouffé to a flat in the 8th arrondissement, where the two then hanged and robbed their victim" (Harris, 1985, p. 477). The sensational trial was of international interest. The Times, for instance, published an extensive and detailed account of each of the trial's five sessions for its English readers, with coverage from Dalziel's News Agency, along with additional comments by "Our own correspondent", as well as a strongly critical editorial commentary at the trial's completion.

Eyraud's guilt had soon been established (by his own admission); and, so, the remainder of the trial was entirely concerned with the part played by Bompard. Maitre Henri-Robert, Bompard's advocate, argued that she had been hypnotized by Eyraud, her co-accused; and therefore, as Eyraud's involuntary accomplice, she could not be held responsible for Gouffé’s murder:

"The chief point at issue, however, was the degree of responsibility of Bompard, and whether there were sufficient grounds for believing that the series of complicated acts involved in the crime could be performed under hypnotic suggestion." — The Lancet, 3 January 1891.

=== Prosecution ===
The two expert witnesses for the prosecution, Paul Brouardel, the eminent professor of forensics at the Faculté de Médecine de Paris, and Gilbert Ballet, Charcot's chef de clinique ('clinical head') at the Salpêtrière, gave evidence that, in their view, any such thing was impossible; and in an extensive (later) discussion of the matter, Georges Gilles de La Tourette, a former pupil of Brouardel and close associate of Charcot, published an extensive account of the matter (i.e., 1891a, and 1891b), "which denied all possibility of a violent act under hypnosis and by suggestion" (Walusinski, 2011, p. 76).

=== Defence ===
Called upon as an expert witness for Bompard's defence as a representative of the Nancy School, Liégeois produced extensive details of the numerous experiments that had satisfied both himself and his Nancy colleagues that crimes could be committed by (innocent) subjects under the influence of hypnotic suggestion. His constant emphasis throughout his testimony that both he and Bernheim held the same opinions is easily explained: Liégeois was a last-minute substitute for Bernheim — and was, therefore, only present as a proxy for Bernheim, rather than as Liégeois, the legal expert who had addressed the Académie des Sciences Morales et Politiques in April and May 1884 (i.e., Liégeois, 1884).

Noting that ever since 1888, in relation to the "theories of Nancy", Bernheim had theorised "from the physiological point of view", whilst he (Liégeois) had theorised from the "moral and judicial sense", Liégeois delivered a four-hour (uninterrupted) opinion as an expert witness:

"Dr. Liégeois of Nancy gave evidence at great length regarding the hypnotic theory put forward by Bompard and her counsel. He stated that he and his colleague, Dr. Bernheim, found that in a state of profound hypnotism there was a complete absence of will in the subject, and that any suggestion made by the hypnotiser passes into the subject and inspires him or her to action. He gave instances of hypnotic subjects being excited to commit thefts, to fire a pistol at a friend, &c. As regards the present case, he thought there was reason to believe that Bompard might have acted under hypnotic suggestion. The fact of her having passed the whole night near the body of a man who had been murdered suggested that she was under some secret influence. In view of the proofs given that she was readily hypnotisable, and his conviction that it was possible for Eyraud to have hypnotised her to act as his accomplice, he thought the jury could not ignore this theory." — The Lancet, 3 January 1891.

In his address to the court, Liégeois stated that his numerous experiments had satisfied both Bernheim and himself that, "in a state of profound somnambulism or hypnotism there is a complete absence of will in the subject, and that any suggestion by the hypnotiser passes into the subject, and inspires him or her to actions". On the grounds that "he considered it possible that she might have received suggestions of which she did not retain any recollection when she was awake", Liégeois complained that he had been refused pre-trial access to Bompard, hoping to hypnotize her "to see to what degree she was open to hypnotic suggestion" and, also, "in order to revive her recollection of the facts which occurred at the moment of the commission of the crime".

=== Verdict ===
Although found guilty, Bompard was not sentenced to death, but was sentenced to 20 years in prison with hard labour, due to what were considered to be "extenuating circumstances". Her accomplice, Eyraud, found "Guilty without extenuating circumstances", was executed by guillotine on 3 February 1891. Bompard was released from prison ten years later, in January 1901, "on account of her good conduct while in prison"; and, three years later, in June 1903, she was pardoned.

=== Demonstration of hypnotic influence (1903) ===
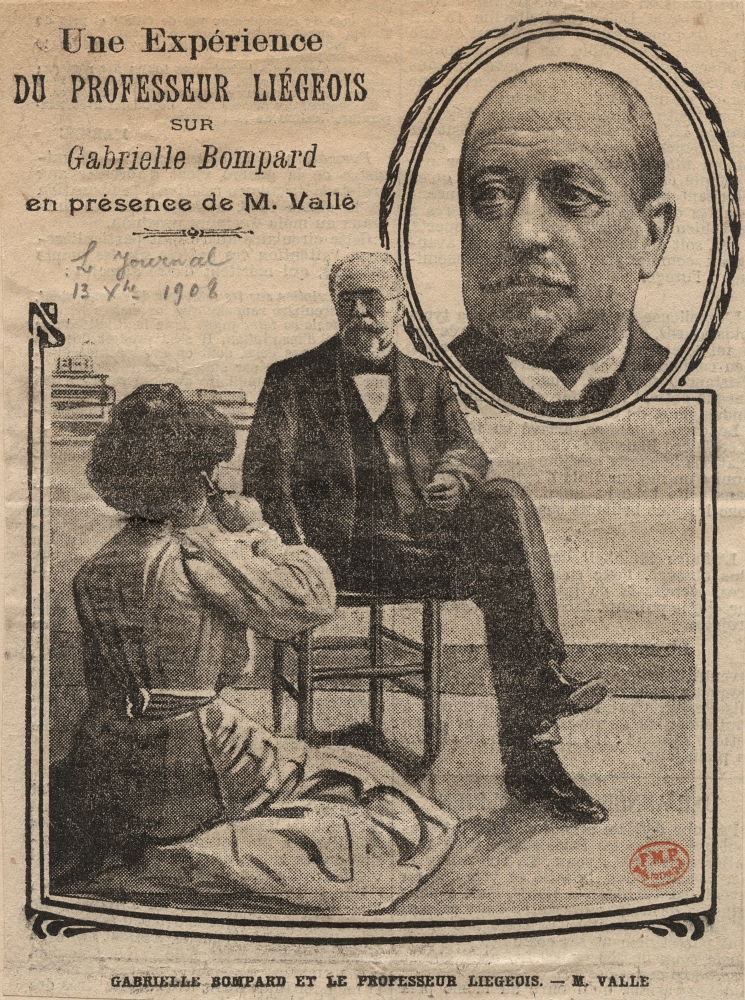
Liégeois' experimenting with Gabrielle Bompard in 1903.

In late 1903, following a request from her 1889 trial advocate, Maitre Henri-Robert, Liégeois conducted various experiments upon Gabrielle Bompard "in order to prove that she had committed the, crime while under the hypnotic influence of Eyraud, a theory [that Henri-Robert had] advanced unsuccessfully at the trial". As result of his experiments, "an officer of the Department of Justice, who was present at the seance ... [said that he was convinced that in] the case of Gabrielle Bompard [there was a] genuine hypnotic irresponsibility of crime".

"Professor Liegeois ... [who] says that he has never met with so easy a [hypnotic] subject ... is convinced [from his experiments] that the woman was compelled to participate in the crime while under hypnotic influence ... [and] that there was a gross miscarriage of justice in condemning such a person for acts for which she was wholly irresponsible, and [he] intends reporting the results of his investigations to the Academy of Medicine." — Press report from London, 11 December 1903.

== Death ==
Jules Liégeois died when "he was run over and killed by a motor car before the eyes of his wife, with whom he was walking on a quiet country road" in the thermal spa town of Bains-les-Bains on 14 August 1908.

== Recognition ==
Liégeois was highly regarded in his lifetime for his contributions to public and administrative law, and to political economy; and, despite not being a medical practitioner, he was widely respected for the rigorous nature of the investigations he conducted into the theory, practice, applications, and efficacy of hypnotic suggestion in general, and for the expert opinions he published on hypnotism and crime in particular.

- 1863: admitted as an Associate Member of the Académie de Stanislas on 23 January 1863.
- 1874: admitted as a Full Member of the Académie de Stanislas on 27 March 1874.
- 1881: admitted as a Full Member of the Society of Comparative Legislation in May 1881.
- 1881-1882: served as President of the Académie de Stanislas.
- 1886: made a Corresponding Member of the Society for Psychical Research.
- 1889: appointed vice-president of the First International Congress of Experimental and Therapeutic Hypnotism, in Paris, in August 1889.
- c.1890: made an Honorary Member of the Gesellschaft Für Psychologische Forschung ('Society for Psychological Research').
- 1892: appointed vice-president of the Second International Congress of Experimental Psychology, in London, in August 1892.
- 1897: appointed Honorary President of the International Congress of Neurology, Psychiatry, Medical Electricity, and Hypnology, in Brussels, in 1897.
- 1899: made a Corresponding Member of the Académie des Sciences Morales et Politiques, the organization to which he had made a significant presentation in 1884.
- 1900: appointed vice-president of the Second International Congress of Experimental and Therapeutic Hypnotism, in Paris, in August 1900.
- 1904: made a Chevalier (Knight) of the Légion d'honneur (Legion of Honour), by decree, on 26 July 1904.

== Memorials ==
=== Bains-les-Bains (1909) ===
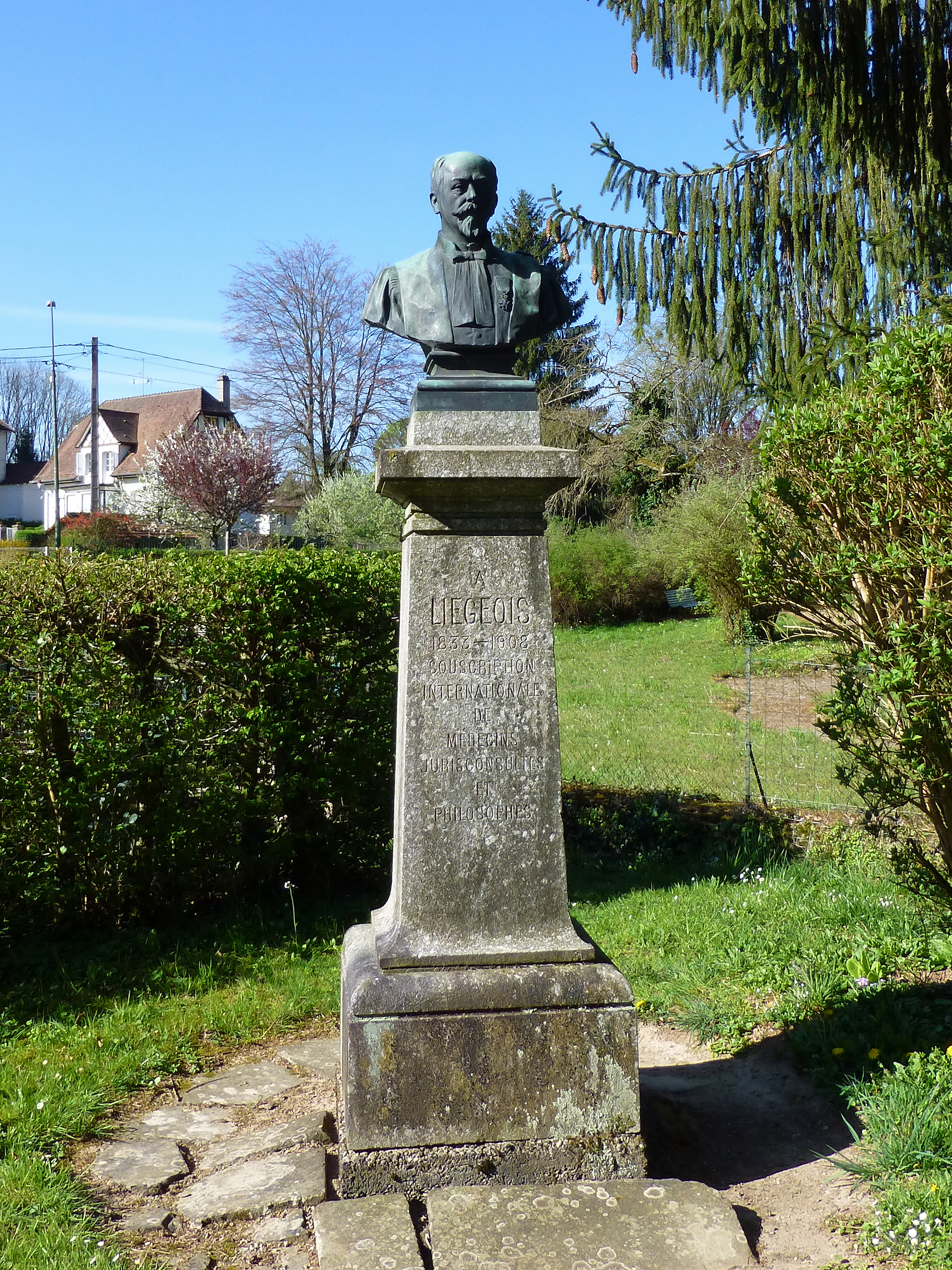
Ernest Bussière's bust of Jules Liégeois in Bains-les-Bains. Erected by international subscript- ion. Unveiled on 22 August 1909.

A bronze bust of Jules Liégeois, created by the Nancy ceramist and sculptor Ernest Bussière (1863-1913) — a member of the other "Nancy School", the École de Nancy founded by the Art Nouveau artist and designer Émile Gallé — was erected on a granite pedestal designed by the architect Louis-Ernest Mougenot (1862-1929), and was unveiled on 22 August 1909, in the park of the thermal establishment at which Liégeois had been a regular spa guest. The monument was raised by international subscription.

- As well as his widow and son representing the Liégeois family, the unveiling was attended by Professor Gaston Floquet of the Science Faculty at Nancy University and vice-president of its Council; Dr. Auguste Mathieu, Director of the thermal spa; Dr. Faivre d'Arcier, of the spa's medical staff; and Professor Edgar Bérillon of l’École de Psychologie in Paris. A last minute change in the date of the unveiling meant that a number of those who intended to be there were unable to attend.
  - Several of those who could attend also made speeches: Professor Gaston Floquet, from Nancy's Science Faculty; Dr. Albert van Renterghem (1845-1939), of Amsterdam, President of the monument's International Subscription Committee; Prof. Henri-Étienne Beaunis, the Nancy colleague of Liégeois; Louis Monal, President of the spa's Administrative Council; Professor Edgar Bérillon, Secretary-General of the Société d'hypnologie et de psychologie; Albert Bonjean (1858-1939), an Advocate from Verviers, Belgium and Secretary to the monument's International Subscription Committee; and Prof. Hippolyte Bernheim, the Nancy colleague of Liégeois.
    - The inscription on the front of the pedestal, "À Liegeois 1833—1908 Souscription Internationale de Medecins Jurisconsultes et Philosophes", indicates that the international subscriptions had come from the medical, legal, and philosophical professions. The inscription on the left-hand side of the pedestal reads "Fut un des fondateurs de l'Ecole Nancy Hypnotisme" ('Was one of the founders of the Nancy School of Hypnotism').

=== Damvillers (1909) ===
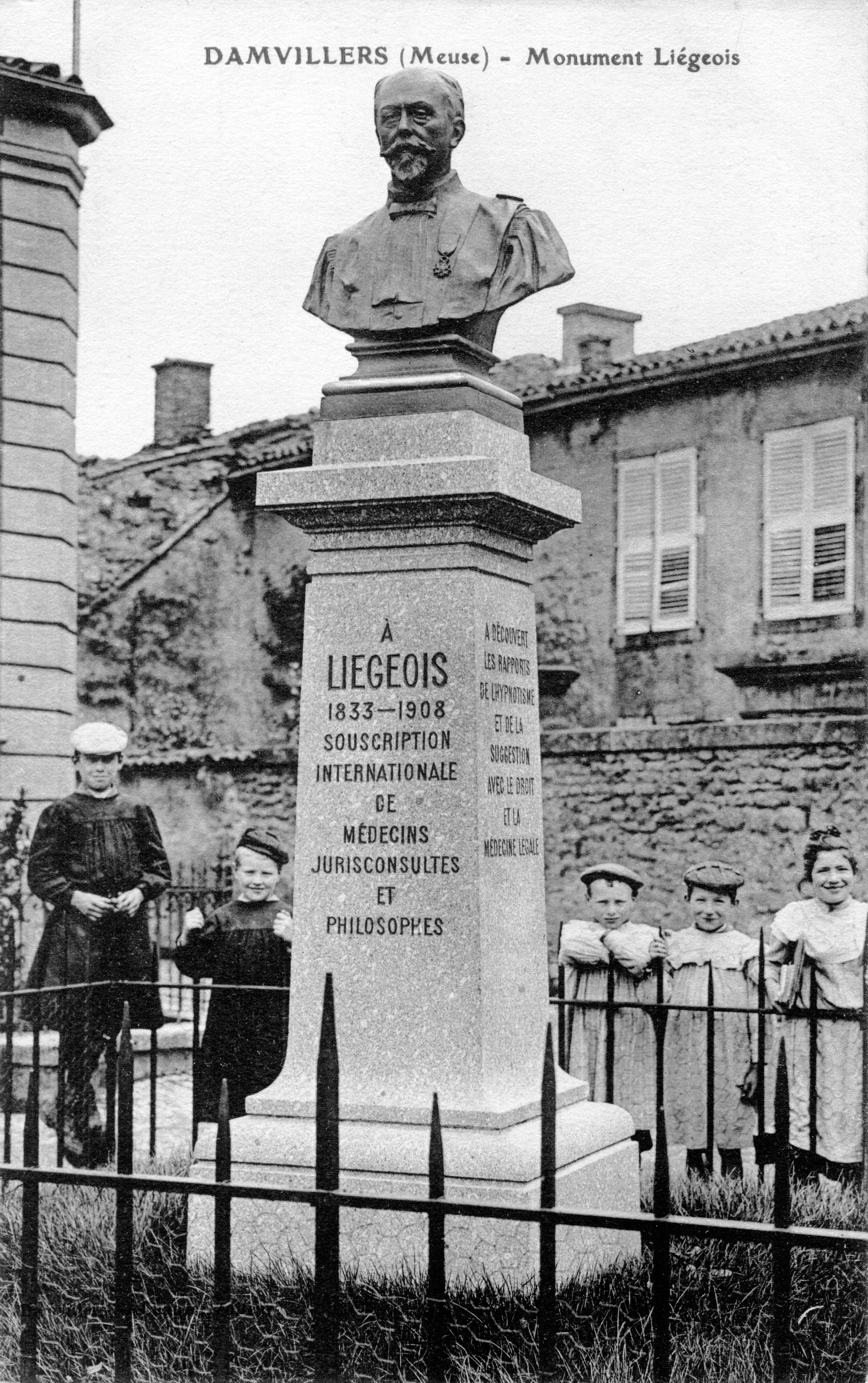
Ernest Bussière's bust of Jules Liégeois in Damvillers, Erected by international subscription. Unveiled on 24 October 1909.

A bronze bust of Jules Liégeois, also by Bussière, was erected upon a granite pedestal in the public square of Damvillers, and unveiled on 24 October 1909. Also raised by international subscription.

- As well as his widow and son representing the Liégeois family, the unveiling was attended by a large number of influential political, legal, and scientific figures: including Albert Lefébure, MP for Meuse; Charles Humbert, Senator for Meuse; Charles Aubert, the Prefect of Meuse, Raoul Catusse, Sub-Prefect of Montmédy; Dr. Edgar Berillon (of Paris), and Dr. Crispulo Diaz (of Puerto Rico), representing the Société d'hypnologie et de psychologie; Georges Jules Guilhermet, Advocate at the Paris Court, representing the 'Ecole de psychologie; Alfred Pierrot, Secretary to the monument's International Subscription Committee, and publisher of Journal de Montmédy; Prof. Ferdinand Brunot, of the Sorbonne; Captain Lallemand, of the 147th Infantry Regiment; Dr. Charles Ernest Maillard, General Councillor of Danville; Gustave Herbillon, District Councillor of Danville (as Liégeois had also been from 1867 to 1871); the painter and architect, Émile Bastien-Lepage; and Jules Constant Bergeron, the Forest Inspector at Montmédy.
  - Following a reception in the Damvillers Town Hall, a number of speeches were delivered, with those who had spoken at Bains-les-Bains (‡) repeating their address: Dr. Dr. Albert van Renterghem (‡), of Amsterdam, President of the International Subscription Committee; Alfred Pierrot, Secretary to the International Subscription Committee and publisher of Journal de Montmédy; Paul Lalondrelle, Mayor of Damvillers; Albert Bonjean (‡), Belgian Advocate and Secretary to the International Subscription Committee; Prof. Charles Lyon-Caen, Dean of the Faculty of Law at the University of Paris and Member of the Académie des Sciences Morales et Politiques; Georges Jules Guilhermet, Advocate (of the Paris Court), representing l'Ecole de psychologie; Professor Edgar Bérillon (‡), Secretary-General of the Société d'hypnologie et de psychologie; Dr. Charles Ernest Maillard, General Councillor of Danville; Albert Lefébure, MP for Meuse; and Charles Humbert, Senator for Meuse.
    - The same inscription on the front of the pedestal, "À Liegeois 1833—1908 Souscription Internationale de Medecins Jurisconsultes et Philosophes", as that at Bains-les-Bains. The inscription on the right-hand side of the pedestal reads "À découvert les rapports de l'hypnotisme et de la suggestion avec le droit et la médecine légale" ('Discovered the connections between hypnotism and suggestion and law and forensic medicine').
    - The bronze bust was removed and melted down by the Germans during their First World War occupation of Damvillers. A replica cast iron bust was re-installed in Danvillers in 1997.

=== Nancy (1909) ===
A plaster version of the same bust, by Bussière, is on display in the reception rooms of the Faculty of Law at Nancy University.

== See also ==
- Actus reus – In criminal law, the "guilty act"
- Agency (philosophy) – Capacity of an actor to act in a given environment
- American Law Institute Model Penal Code Rule (ALI rule) – Guideline governing legal pleas of insanity
- Automatism (law) – Legal defence based on lack of awareness of actions
- Henri-Étienne Beaunis – French physiologist, psychologist, and founding member of the Nancy School of Hypnosis
- Hippolyte Bernheim – French physician, neurologist, and founding member of the Nancy School of Hypnosis
- Brainwashing – Methods that purportedly control a person's will, desire, or knowledge
- Causality – How one process influences another
- Candy Jones – American fashion model and radio host (1925–1990)
- Confabulation – Recall of fabricated, misinterpreted or distorted memories
- Copenhagen hypnosis murders – 1951 murders in Denmark
- Credulity – Willingness or ability to believe that a statement is true
- Culpability – Degree to which one is morally or legally responsible for a crime
- Demand characteristics – Extraneous variable in social research
- Durham rule – Guideline governing legal pleas of insanity
- False memory – Psychological occurrence
- Forensic psychology – Connecting psychology and the justice system
- Hypnosis – State of increased suggestibility
- Ideomotor phenomenon – Concept in hypnosis and psychological research
- Invasion of the Body Snatchers – 1956 horror film directed by Don Siegel
- Ambroise-Auguste Liébeault – French physician and founding member of the Nancy School of Hypnosis
- M'Naghten rules – Guideline governing legal pleas of insanity
- Manipulation (psychology) – Exploitative type of social influence
- Mass hysteria – Spread of illness without organic cause
- Mass suicide – Groups of people killing themselves together
- Medical jurisprudence – Branch of science and medicine
- Memory erasure – Selective artificial removal of memories or associations from the mind
- Mens rea – In criminal law, the "guilty mind"
- MKUltra – CIA program involving illegal experimentation on human test subjects (1953–1972)
- The Nancy School of Hypnosis – French school of psychotherapy from 1866
- Posthypnotic amnesia – Inability in hypnotic subjects to recall events that took place while under hypnosis
- R v Burgess (1991) – 1991 English legal appeal
- The Salpêtrière School of Hypnosis – French school of psychotherapy from 1882
- Somnambulism – Sleeping phenomenon combined with wakefulness
  - Sleepwalking as a legal defense
  - "Sleep" and "legal automatism"
- Source misattribution – Misidentification during memory recall
- Suggestibility – Inclination to accept the suggestions of others
- Suggestion – Psychological process of guiding a person
- The Manchurian Candidate – 1959 novel by Richard Condon
