= Amédée Dumontpallier =

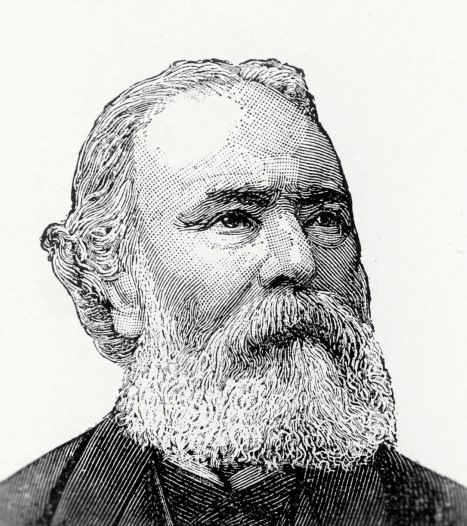
Amédée Dumontpallier

Victor Alphonse Amédée Dumontpallier (8 March 1826, Honfleur – 13 January 1899, Paris) was a French gynecologist best known for his studies of hypnotism and metalloscopy (metallotherapy).

In 1857 he received his medical doctorate in Paris, where from 1863 he served as chef de clinique at the Hôtel-Dieu. In 1866 he was named chef de service at the Hôpital de la Pitié in Paris.

From 1860 to 1879 he was a member of the Société de biologie, and in 1892 was elected as a member of the Académie de médecine. In 1891 he was named president of the Société d'hypnologie et de psychologie, an organization of which, he was also a co-founder. In 1886, he co-founded the journal "Revue de l'hypnotisme expérimental et thérapeutique".

He was a prominent member of the so-called "Salpêtrière School of Hypnosis". He described the phenomenon of "bilateral hallucinations" and opposing expressions (double expressions). In his experiments, he demonstrated that a patient under hypnosis could simultaneously show expressions of joy on one side of the face and despair on the other side.

His name is associated with the "Dumontpallier pessary" (Le pessaire de Dumontpallier), a medical device used for uterine prolapse.

== Selected works ==
- Étude expérimentale sur la métalloscopie et la métallothérapie du Dr Burq, rapports faits à la Société de biologie (1877-1878), 1879 – Experimental study on the metalloscopy and metallotherapy of Dr. Victor Burq.
- Note sur l'analgésie thérapeutique locale déterminée par l'irritation de la région similaire du côté opposé du corps, 1880 – Note on localized analgesia therapy, etc.
- Revue descriptive des appareils destinés aux applications thérapeutiques de la chaleur et du froid (with Émile Galante), 1880 – Descriptive review of apparatuses for the therapeutic applications of heat and cold.
- Hypnotisme expérimental. La dualité cérébrale et l'indépendance fonctionnelle des deux hémisphères cérébraux (with Edgar Bérillon), 1884 – Experimental hypnosis; cerebral duality and functional independence of the two cerebral hemispheres.
- Traitement local de l'endométrite chronique: communication faite à l'Académie de médecine, 1891 – Local treatment of chronic endometritis.
