= Paul Brémaud =

Paul Brémaud (27 March 1846, in Brest – 12 May 1905, in Brest) was a French naval physician, known for his studies in the field of hypnosis.

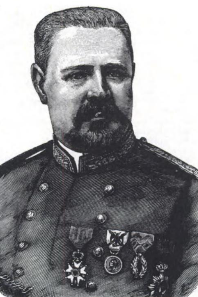
Naval physician, Paul Brémaud

He studied at the naval school of medicine in Brest, and from 1866 served as an assistant surgeon. In 1869 he received his doctorate in medicine from the University of Montpellier with a thesis on Pott's disease titled Quelques considérations sur le mal de Pott, and during the same year became a naval physician, second-class. For a number of years, he worked as a colonial doctor in Réunion, Madagascar, Cochinchina, Tonkin and the West Indies. In 1889 he was named a professor of hygiene at the school of medicine in Pondicherry, and afterwards was appointed chief physician of the Escadre du Nord at the naval hospital in Brest.

From 1882 he participated in Jean Martin Charcot's celebrated experiments involving hypnosis at the Salpêtrière in Paris, about which, he published numerous articles, including Des différentes phases de l'hypnotisme et en particulier de la fascination ("The different phases of hypnotism and in particular fascination"; 1884). In 1887 he became a chevalier in the Légion d'Honneur.
