= Alexandre Bertrand =

French archaeologist (1820–1902)

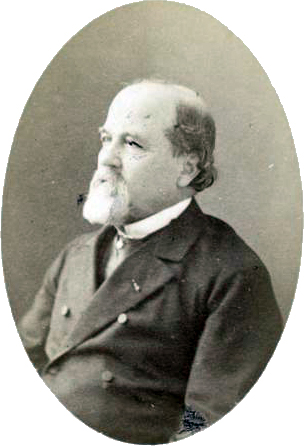
Alexandre Bertrand, in 1882.

Alexandre Louis Joseph Bertrand (11 June 1820 – 1902) was a French archaeologist born in Rennes.

== Life ==
He was the son of physician Alexandre Jacques François Bertrand (1795-1831) and the elder brother of mathematician Joseph Louis François Bertrand (1822-1900).

Alexandre Bertrand studied at the École normale supérieure, and later taught classes at the lycée in Laval (from 1848). In 1849 he became a member of the École française d'Athènes, and from 1851 to 1858 served as a professor of rhetoric at the lycée in Rennes.

Bertrand was a pioneer of Gallic and Gallo-Roman archaeology, and was involved in the archaeological dig at Alise-Sainte-Reine (1861/62). In 1864, with Louis Félicien de Saulcy, he directed excavations of burial mounds at Meloisey.

In 1862 he founded the Gallo-Roman museum in Saint-Germain-en-Laye, serving as its curator from 1867 until his death in 1902. Assisting him in this endeavor were Gabriel de Mortillet (1868 to 1885) and Salomon Reinach (1886 to 1902).

From 1882 he taught classes in archaeology at the École du Louvre. He was an editor of Revue Archeologique and a member of Académie des Inscriptions et Belles-Lettres.

== Selected writings ==
- Études de mythologie et d'archéologie grecques, d'Athènes à Argos, 1858 - Studies of Greek mythology and archaeology of Athens and Argos.
- Archéologie celtique & gauloise, mémoires et documents relatifs aux premiers temps de notre histoire nationale, 1876 - Celtic and Gallic archaeology.
- La Gaule avant les Gaulois, 1891 - Gaul prior to the Gallic.
- Les Celtes dans les vallées du Po et du Danube, 1894 - Celtic people in the Po and Danube Valleys.
