= Hypnoscope =

Hypnosis testing instrument

A hypnoscope is an instrument intended to determine a person's susceptibility to hypnotic influences.

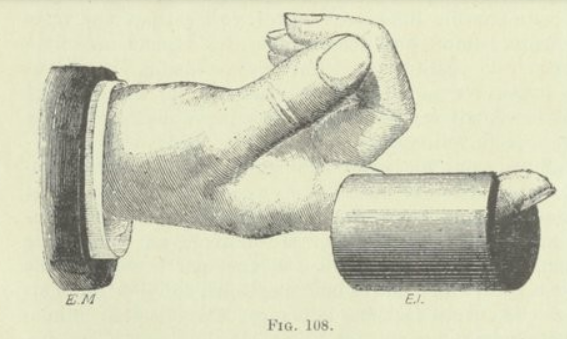
Hypnoscope

== History ==
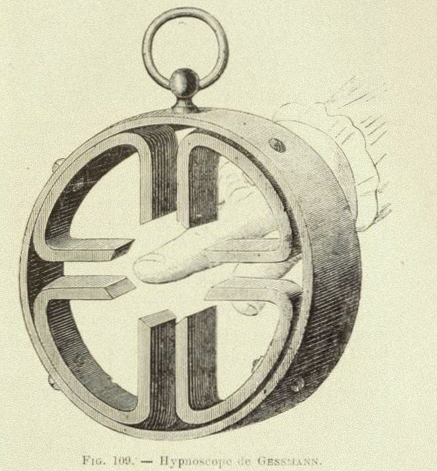
Gessman's Hypnoscope

Plenty of hypnotists, like Franz Mesmer and others, proclaimed that the human body was susceptible to magnetic fields. At the end of the 19th century some psychologists tried to measure humans' susceptibility to hypnosis with magnets. The patient had to put a finger inside the magnetic field, and if he had felt any influence he was considered a hypnable person.

Some psychologists, like Julian Ochorowicz or Gessman, created their original hypnoscopes for testing hypnability of their patients. The instrument and the method met some serious criticism from Frank Podmore and, eventually, psychologists lost their interest.
