= Gilbert Ballet =

French psychiatrist, neurologist and historian

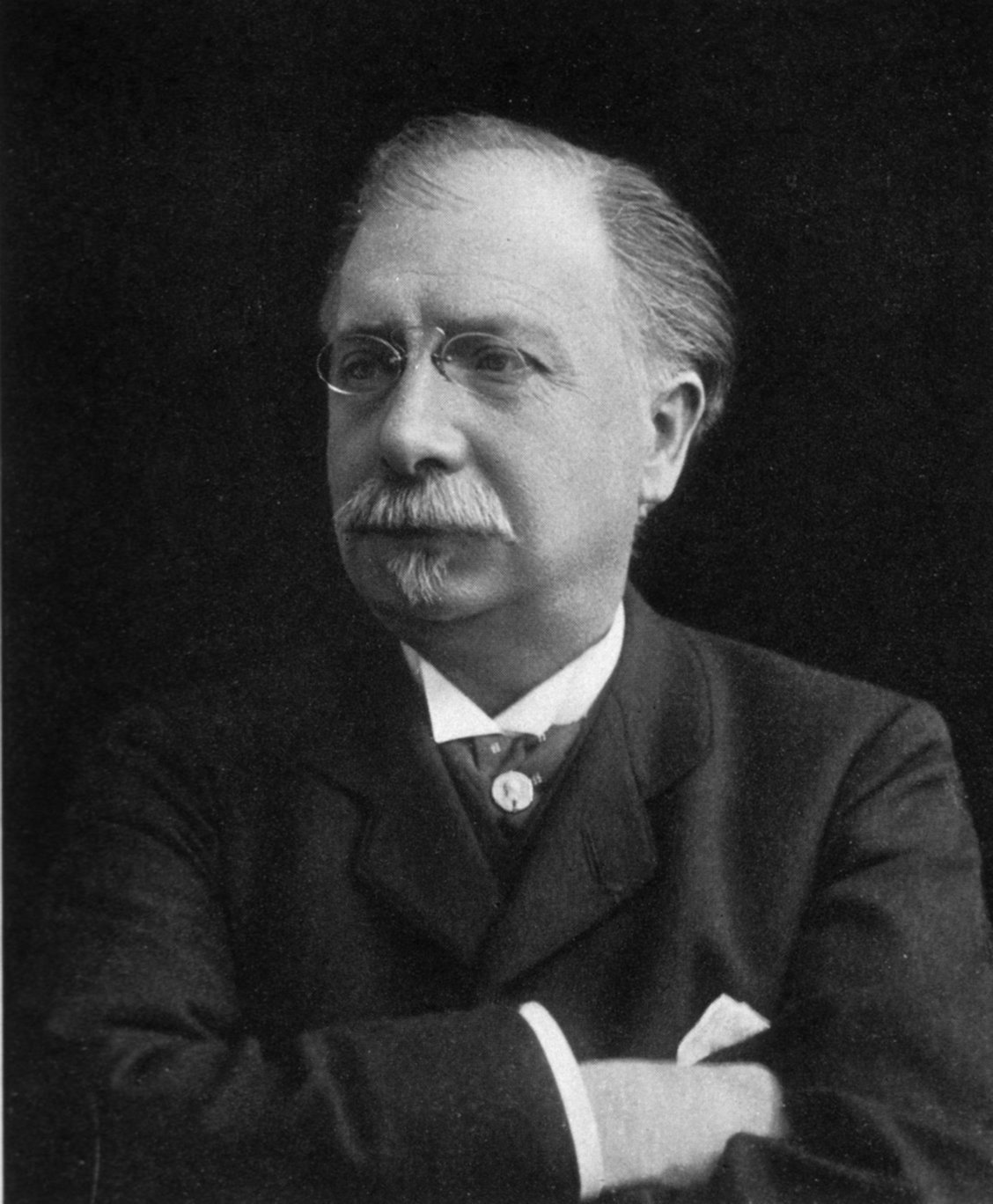
Gilbert Ballet (1853–1916)

Gilbert Ballet (March 29, 1853 – March 17, 1916) was a French psychiatrist, neurologist and historian who was a native of Ambazac in the department of Haute-Vienne.

He studied medicine in Limoges and Paris, and subsequently became Chef de clinique under Jean-Martin Charcot (1825–1893) at the Salpêtrière. In 1900 he became a professor of psychiatry, and in 1904 established the department of psychiatry at Hôtel-Dieu de Paris. In 1909 he succeeded Alix Joffroy as chair of clinical psychiatry and brain disorders at the Hôpital Sainte-Anne.

In 1909 Ballet was elected president of the Société française d'histoire de la médecine, and in 1912 became a member of the Académie des sciences.

Ballet is remembered for his 1903 publication of Traité de pathologie mentale, which remained a principal reference book on psychiatry for nearly fifty years in France. In 1911 Ballet described a disorder he called psychose hallucinatoire chronique, being defined as chronic delirium that consists primarily of hallucinations. In French psychiatry, "chronic hallucinatory psychosis" was to become classified as a distinct entity, separate from other self-delusional disorders.

Among his other works were a 1888 publication on inner speech in aphasia, Le Langage Interieur et les Diverses Formes de l'Aphasie, an 1897 treatise on hypochondria and paranoia titled Psychoses et affections nerveuses, and an historical biography on philosopher Emanuel Swedenborg ("Swedenborg; histoire d'un visionnaire aux XVIIIe siècle"). With Adrien Proust, he published L'Hygiène du neurasthénique, a book that was later translated into English and published as "The Treatment of Neurasthenia".

== Associated eponym ==
- "Ballet's sign": Palsy affecting one or more extraocular muscles, commonly associated with Graves' ophthalmopathy.

== See also ==
- A Clinical Lesson at the Salpêtrière – 1887 group tableau portrait by André Brouillet
