= Alexandre Jacques François Bertrand =

French physician and mesmerist

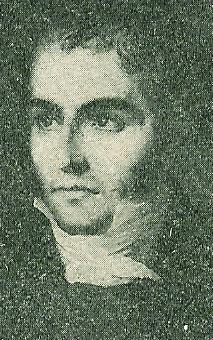
Alexandre Bertrand circa 1820

Alexandre Jacques François Bertrand (25 April 1795 – 22 January 1831) was a French medical doctor and mesmerist who was a native of Rennes. He was the father of archaeologist Alexandre Bertrand (1820–1902) and mathematician Joseph Bertrand (1822–1900). He was also an ally of the philosopher Pierre Leroux (1798–1871) and the Saint-Simonians.

Bertrand is remembered for his scientific investigations of animal magnetism and somnambulism. In his public lectures on animal magnetism, he spoke confidently about the existence of a "magnetic fluid", but through experience and reflection he later changed his mind, becoming a leading critic of the fluid theory.

From 1825 to 1830 Bertrand published numerous articles in the progressive journal Le Globe.

== Selected writings ==
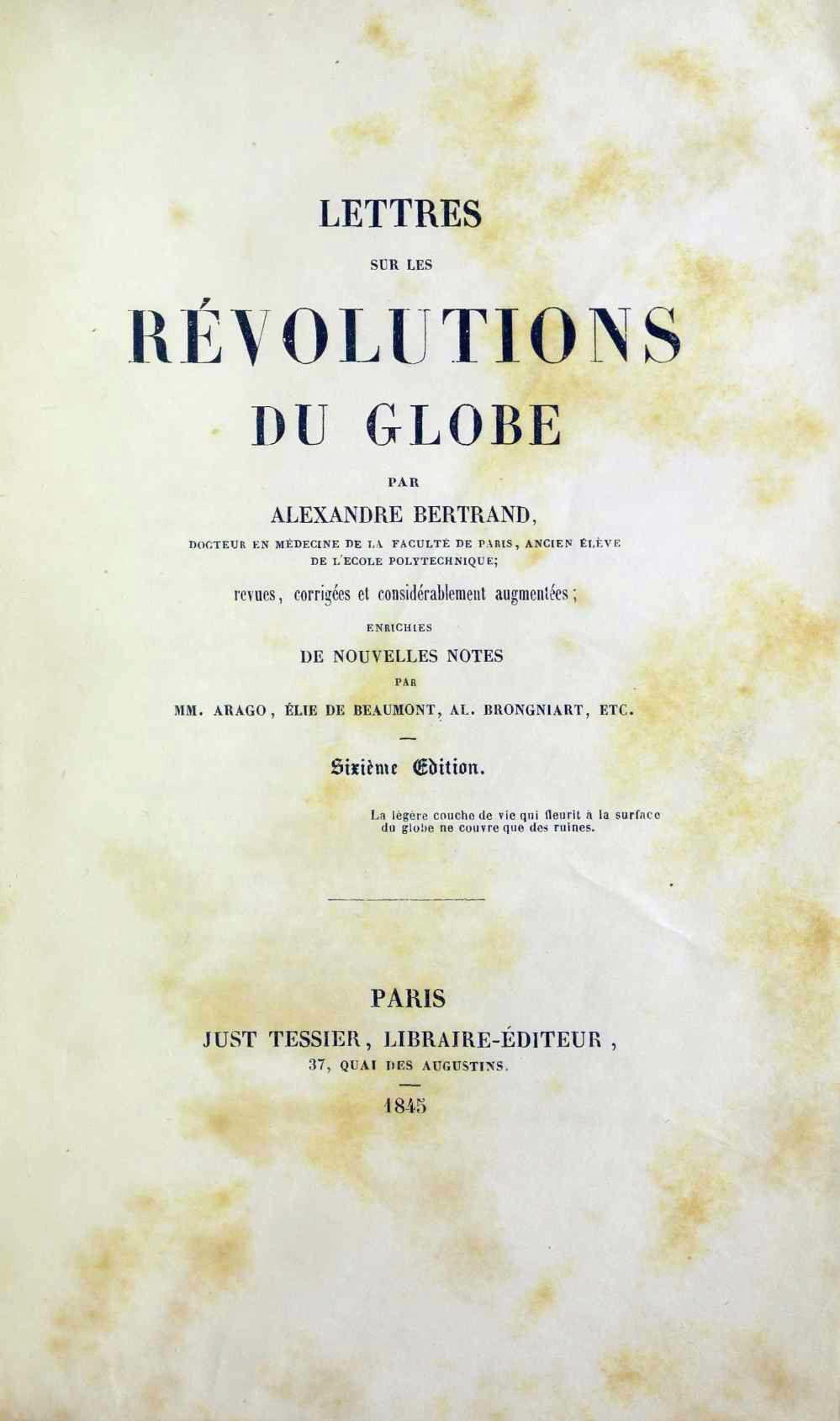
Lettres sur les rèvolutions du globe, 1845

- Traité du somnambulisme et des différentes modifications qu'il présente (Treatise on sleepwalking and the various changes it presents), Paris, Dentu, 1823.
- Lettres sur les rèvolutions du globe. 1824.
  - Lettres sur les rèvolutions du globe. Paris: Bossange frères. 1845.
- Lettres sur la physique, Paris, Bossange frères, 1824 and 1825.
- De l'extase (Of Ecstasy), Paris, 1826.
- Du magnétisme en France et des jugements qu'en ont porté les sociétés savantes (Of magnetism in France and judgments of the learned societies), Paris, Baillière, 1826.- Republication L'Harmattan, 2004 - ISBN 2-7475-6319-7.
