= Chronic hallucinatory psychosis =

Chronic Hallucinatory Psychosis
- Specialty: Psychiatry
- Symptoms: mental automatism, chronic hallucinations and secondary delusions

Chronic hallucinatory psychosis is a psychosis subtype, classified under "Other nonorganic psychosis" by the ICD-10 Chapter V: Mental and behavioural disorders. Other abnormal mental symptoms in the early stages are, as a rule, absent. The patient is most usually quiet and orderly, with a good memory.

First described by Ballet, during 1912, it has often been a matter of the greatest difficulty to decide under which heading of the recognized classifications individual members of this group should be placed. As the hallucinations give rise to slight depression, some might possibly be included under melancholia. In others, paranoia may develop. Others, again, might be swept into the widespread net of dementia praecox. This state of affairs cannot be regarded as satisfactory, for they are not truly cases of melancholia, paranoia, dementia praecox or any other described affection.

This disease, as its name suggests, is a hallucinatory case, for it is its main feature. These may be of all senses, but auditory hallucinations are the most prominent. At the beginning, the patient may realize that the hallucination is a morbid phenomenon and unaccountable. They may claim to hear a "voice" speaking, though there is no one in the flesh actually doing so. Such a state of affairs may last for years and possibly, though rarely, for life, and the subject would not be deemed insane in the ordinary sense of the word.

It's probable, however, that this condition forms the first stage of the illness, which eventually develops on definite lines. What usually happens is the patient seeks an explanation for the hallucinations. As none is forthcoming they try to account for their presence and the result is a delusion, and, most frequently, a delusion of persecution. Also, it needs to be noted that the delusion is a comparatively late arrival and is the logical result of the hallucinations.

== Sources ==
A paper read at the Quarterly Meeting of the Medico-Psychological Association on February 24, 1920, written by Robert Hunter Steen, King's College Hospital, London
