= Edgar Bérillon =

French psychiatrist (1859-1948)

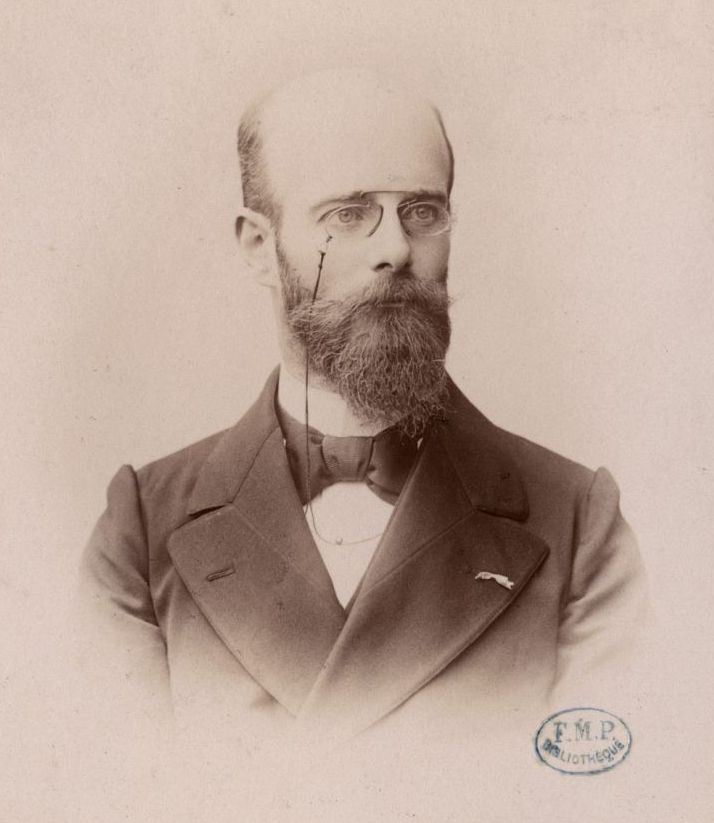
Edgar Bérillon (ca. 1890)

Edgar Bérillon (23 May 1859, Saint-Fargeau – 6 March 1948) was a French psychiatrist known for his research of hypnosis.

He studied medicine in Paris, and from 1882 worked as a préparateur of comparative pathology courses at the Muséum d'histoire naturelle. In 1884 he received his medical doctorate with the dissertation-thesis "De l'indépendance fonctionnelle des deux hémisphères cérébraux". He worked as an inspector of Asiles d'aliénés de la Seine (Mental asylums of the Seine), and from 1888, taught classes at the École pratique de la faculté de médecine. In 1900 he became a professor at the École de Psychologie in Paris.

In 1886, he became director of the "Revue de l'hypnotisme expérimental et thérapeutique", a journal that was later renamed as "Revue de l'hypnotisme et de la psychologie physiologique". In 1889 he was named general secretary of the Société d'hypnologie et de psychologie, and in 1905 was appointed president of the Société de pathologie comparé.

== Selected works ==
- De l'indépendance fonctionnelle des deux hémisphères cérébraux, 1884 – The functional independence of the two cerebral hemispheres.
- Hypnotisme expérimental : La dualité cérébrale et l'indépendance fonctionnelle des deux hémisphères cérébraux, 1884 – Experimental hypnotism; the cerebral duality of functional independence of the two cerebral hemispheres.
- De la suggestion hypnotique dans le traitement de l'hystérie, 1890 – The hypnotic suggestion in the treatment of hysteria.
- Les indications formelles de la suggestion hypnotique en psychiatrie et en neuropathologie, 1891 – Formal indications of hypnotic suggestion in psychiatry and neuropathology.
- L'Hypnotisme et l'orthopédie mentale, 1898 – Hypnotism and mental orthopedics.
- Le traitement psychologique de l'alcoolisme, 1906 – Psychological treatment of alcoholism.
- L'oeuvre psychologique du Dr Liébeault, 1906 – The psychological works of Ambroise-Auguste Liébeault.
- La bromidrose fétide de la race Allemande, 1915 – The fetid bromidrosis of the German race.
- La psychologique de la race Allemande, 1917 – The psychology of the German race.
- La science de l'hypnotisme (2 volumes) – The science of hypnotism.
  - L'Hypnotisme expérimental, 1944 – Experimental hypnotism.
  - L'Hypnotisme thérapeutique, 1947 – Therapeutic hypnotism.
