= Royal Commission on Animal Magnetism =

1784 French scientific bodies' investigations involving systematic controlled trials

The Royal Commission on Animal Magnetism involved two entirely separate and independent French Royal Commissions, each appointed by Louis XVI in 1784, that were conducted simultaneously by a committee composed of four physicians from the Paris Faculty of Medicine (Faculté de médecine de Paris) and five scientists from the Royal Academy of Sciences (Académie des sciences) (the "Franklin Commission", named for Benjamin Franklin), and a second committee composed of five physicians from the Royal Society of Medicine (Société Royale de Médecine) (the "Society Commission").

Each Commission took five months to complete its investigations. The "Franklin" Report was presented to the King on 11 August 1784 – and was immediately published and very widely circulated throughout France and neighbouring countries – and the "Society" Report was presented to the King five days later on 16 August 1784.

The "Franklin Commission's" investigations are notable as a very early "classic" example of a systematic controlled trial, which not only applied "sham" and "genuine" procedures to patients with "sham" and "genuine" disorders, but, significantly, was the first to use the "blindfolding" of both the investigators and their subjects.

The report of the ["Franklin"] Royal Commission of 1784 ... is a masterpiece of its genre, and enduring testimony to the power and beauty of reason. ... Never in history has such an extraordinary and luminous group [as the "Franklin Commission"] been gathered together in the service of rational inquiry by the methods of experimental science. For this reason alone the [Report of the "Franklin Commission"] ... is a key document in the history of human reason. It should be rescued from obscurity, translated into all languages, and reprinted by organizations dedicated to the unmasking of quackery and the defense of rational thought.

— Stephen Jay Gould (1989)

Both sets of Commissioners were specifically charged with investigating the claims made by Charles-Nicolas d’Eslon (1750–1786) for the existence of a substantial (rather than metaphorical) "animal magnetism", le magnétisme animal, and of a similarly (non-metaphorical) physical "magnetic fluid", le fluide magnétique. Further, having completed their investigations into the claims of d'Eslon – that is, they did not examine Franz Mesmer, Mesmer's theories, Mesmer's principles, Mesmer's practices, Mesmer's techniques, Mesmer's apparatus, Mesmer's claims, Mesmer's "cures" or, even, "mesmerism" itself – they were each required to make "a separate and distinct report".

Before the ["Franklin" Commission's] investigations began, [Antoine Lavoisier] had studied the writings of d'Eslon and [had] drawn up a plan for the conduct of the inquiry. He decided that the commissioners should not study any of the alleged cures, but [that] they should determine whether animal magnetism existed by trying to magnetize a person without his knowledge or making him think that he had been magnetized when in fact he had not. This plan was adopted by the commissioners, and the results came out as Lavoisier had predicted.

— Frank A. Pattie (1994)

From their investigations both Commissions concluded (a) that there was no evidence of any kind to support d'Eslon's claim for the substantial physical existence of either his supposed "animal magnetism" or his supposed "magnetic fluid", and (b) that all of the effects that they had observed could be attributed to a physiological (rather than metaphysical) agency. Whilst each Commission implicitly accepted that there was no collusion, pretence, or extensive subject training involved on the part of d'Eslon, they both (independently) concluded that all of the phenomena they had observed during each of their investigations could be directly attributed to "contact", "imagination", and/or "imitation".

For clearness of reasoning and strict impartiality [the "Franklin" Commissioners' report] has never been surpassed. After detailing the various experiments made, and their results, they came to the conclusion that the only proof advanced in support of Animal Magnetism was the effects it produced on the human body – that those effects could be produced without passes or other magnetic manipulations – that all these manipulations, and passes, and ceremonies never produce any effect at all if employed without the patient's knowledge; and that therefore imagination did, and animal magnetism did not, account for the phenomena.

— Charles Mackay (1841, emphasis added)

== Reasons for the investigation ==
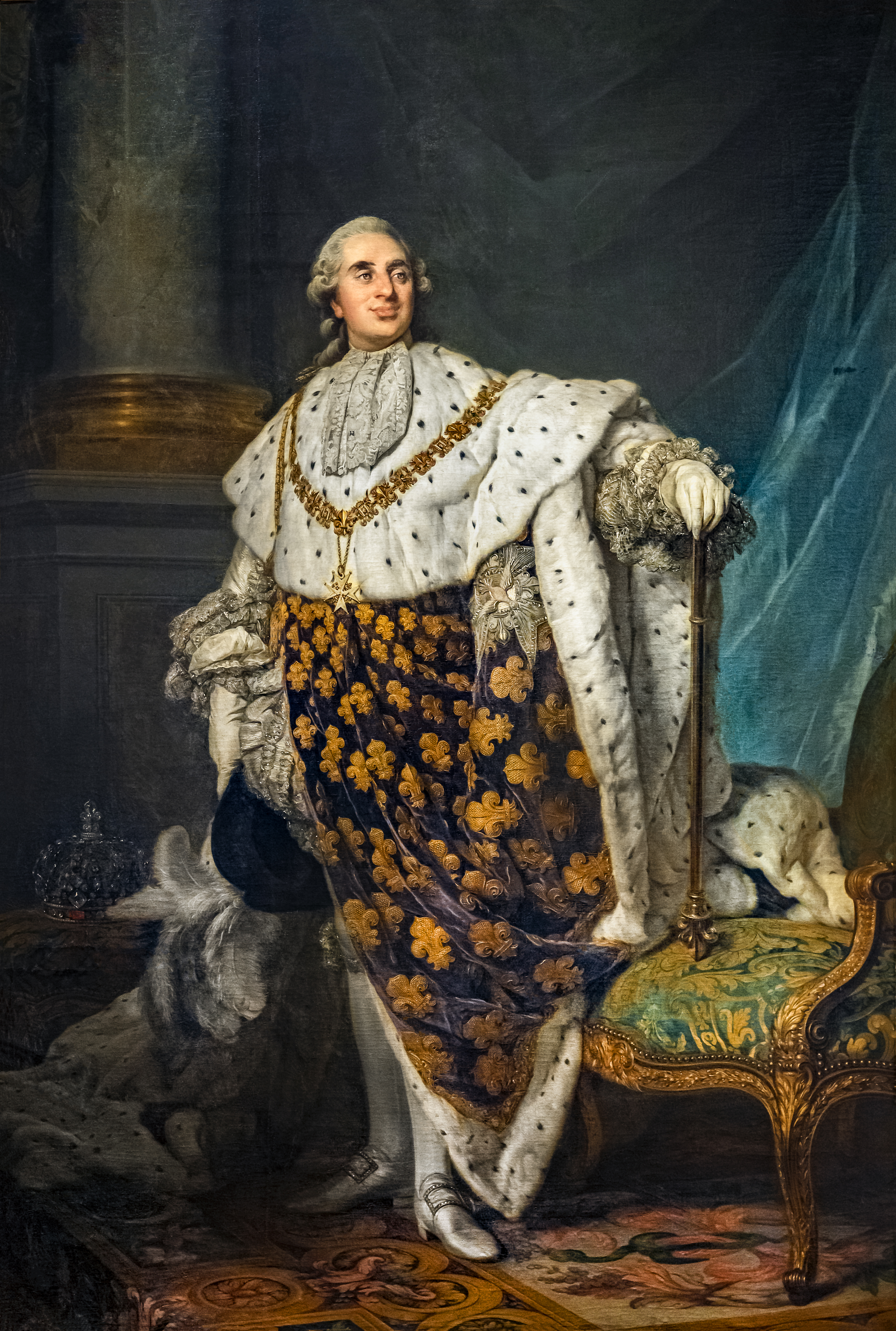
Portrait of Louis XVI by Joseph Duplessis (1776)

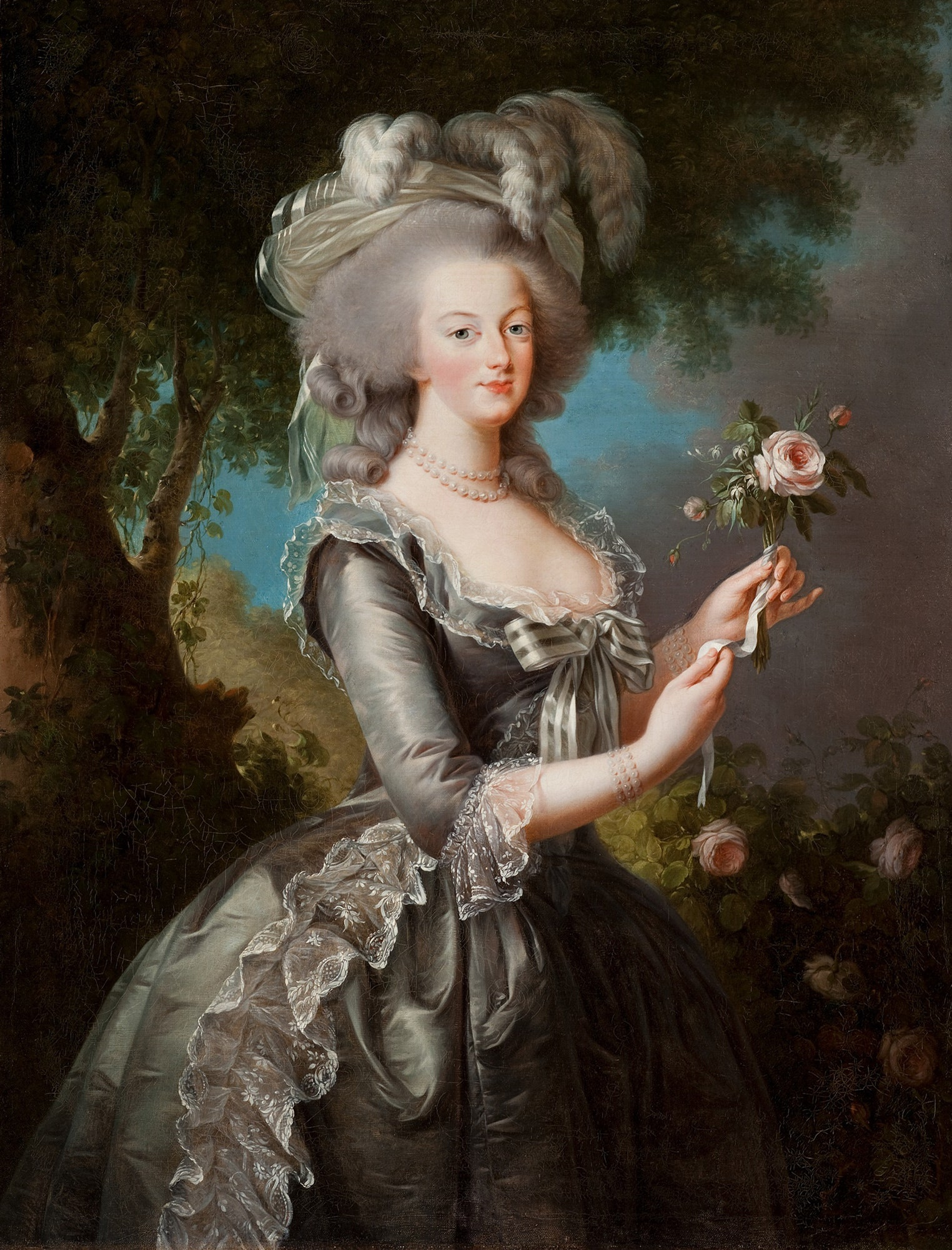
Marie Antoinette

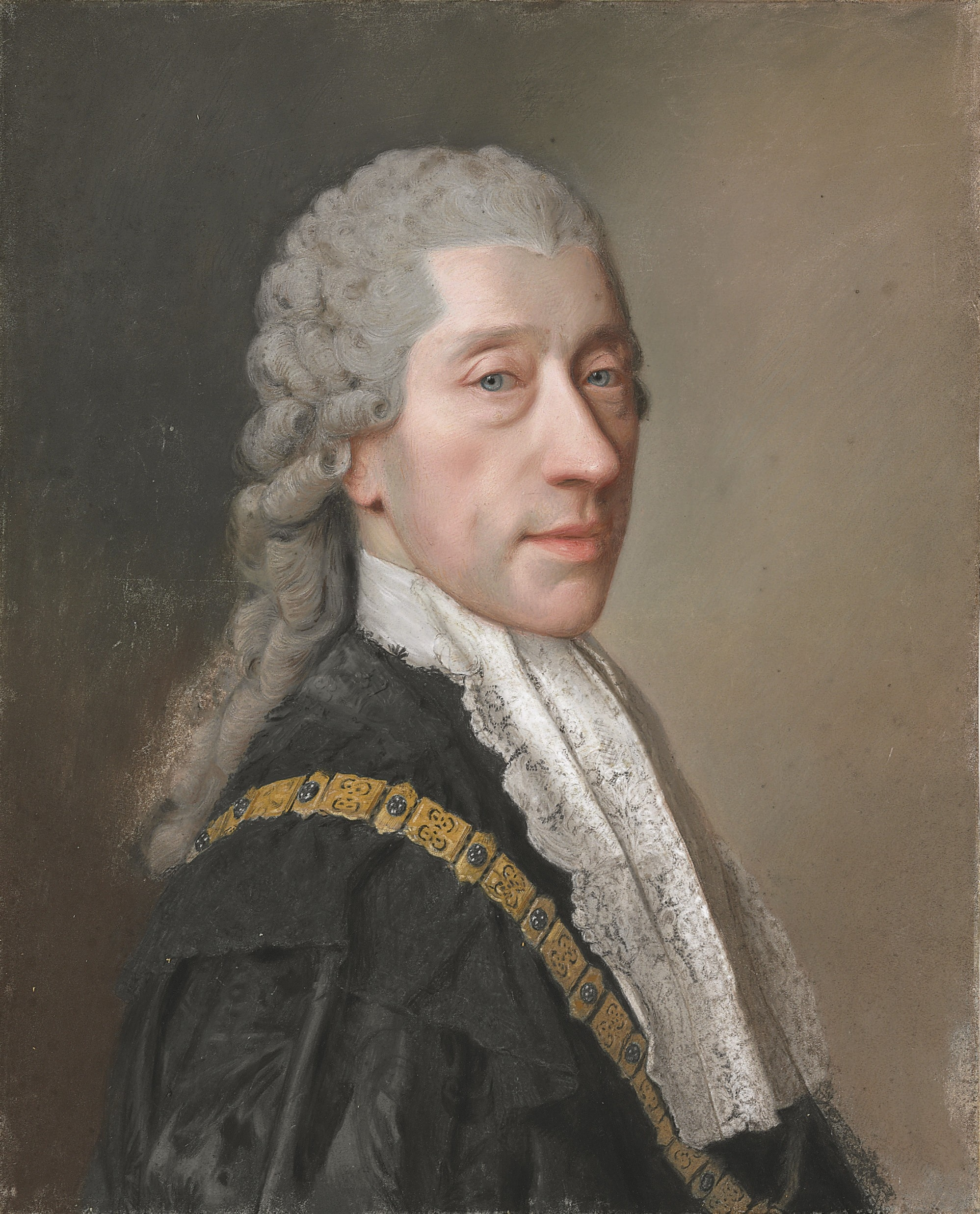
Chancellor von Kaunitz

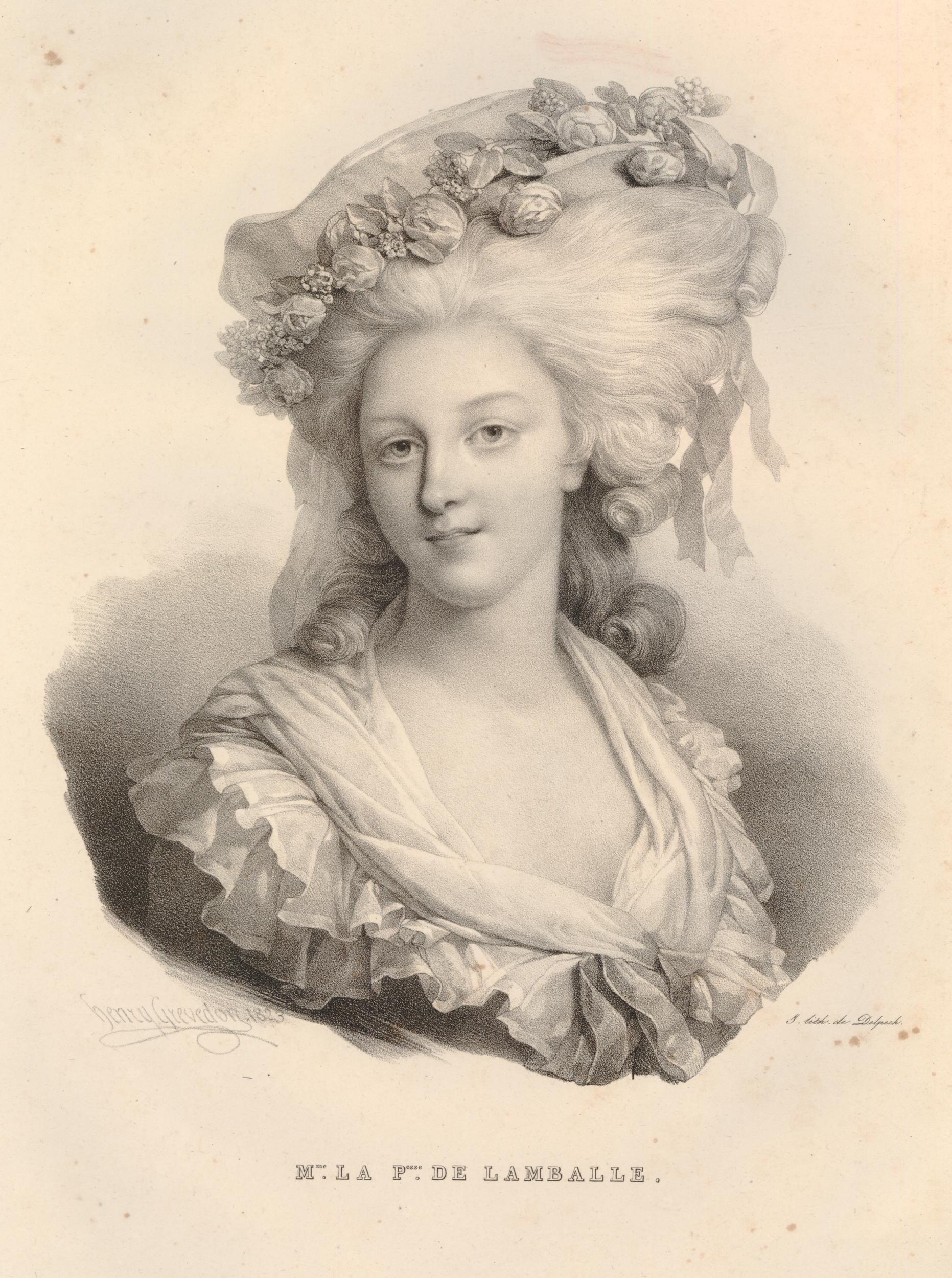
Princess of Lamballe

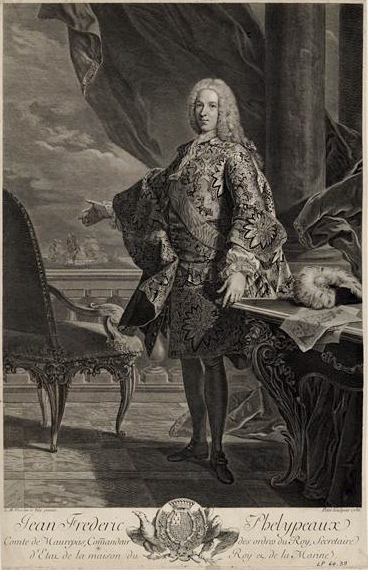
Jean-Frédéric Phélypeaux, the French Minister of State

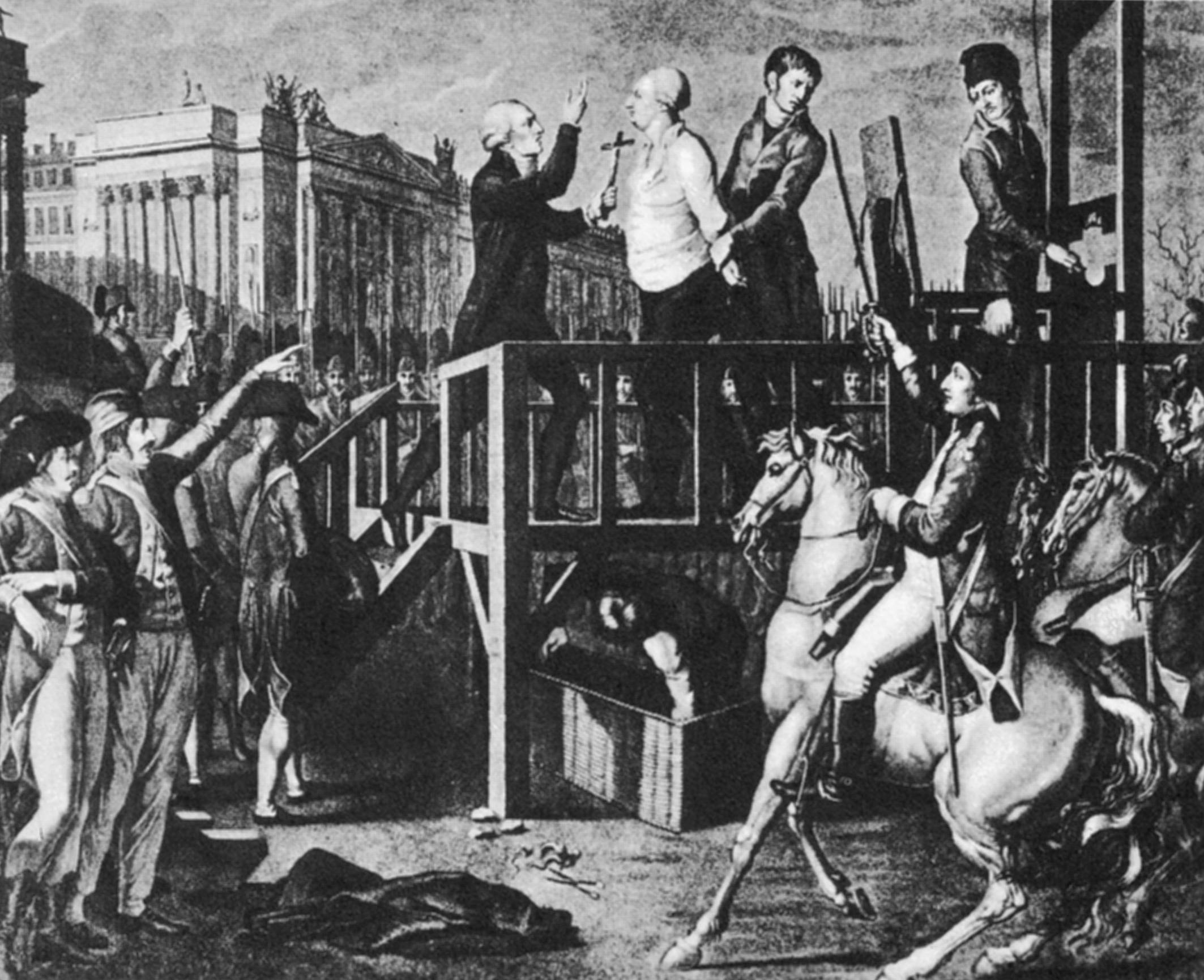
The execution of King Louis XVI

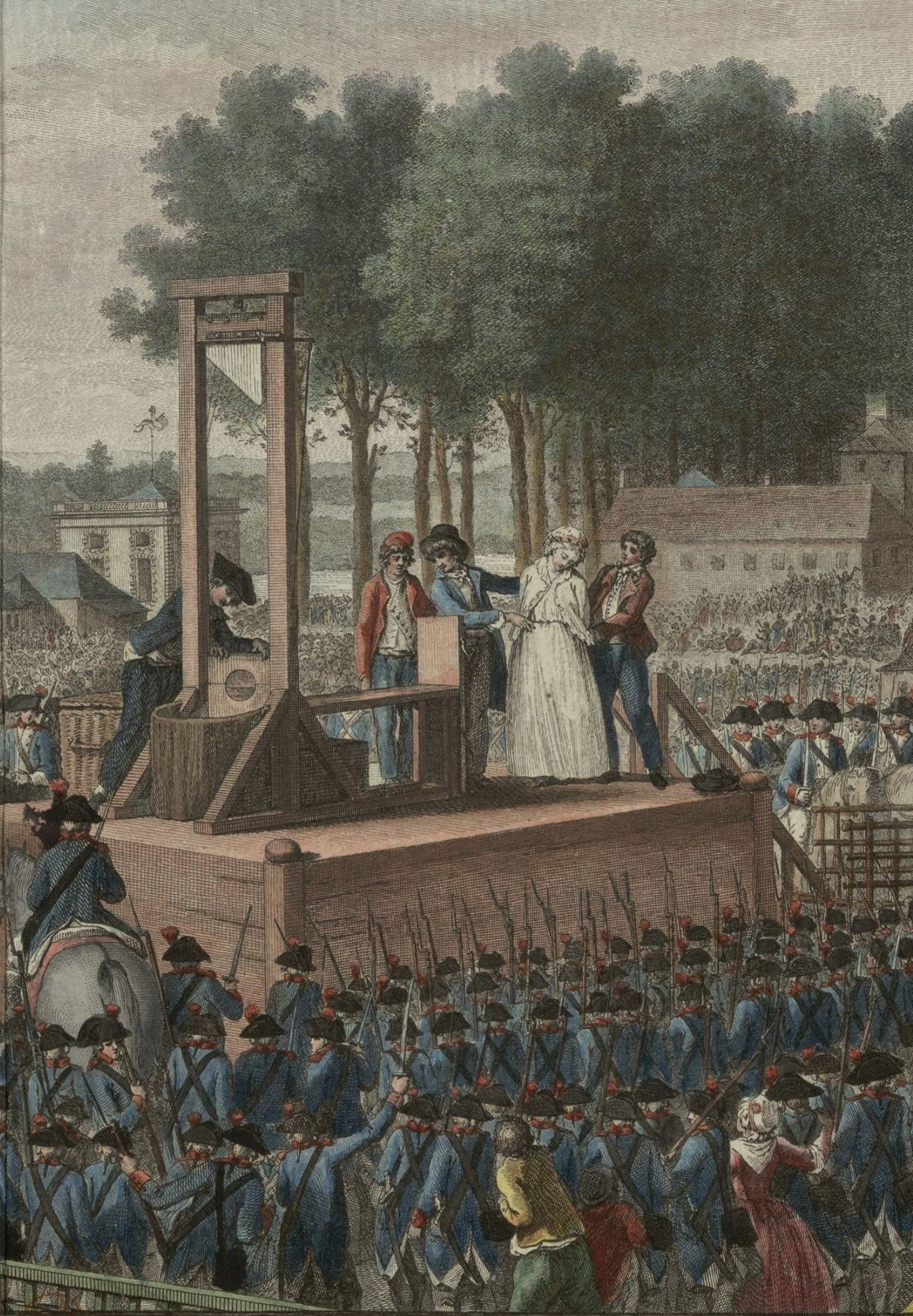
The execution of Marie Antoinette

The rise of mesmerism [was] symptomatic of several philosophical and psychological conflicts: spirit/mind vs. body; science and philosophy vs. psychology and the imagination; rationalism and empiricism vs. the irrational and unknown; [and] consciousness vs. the unconscious.

— Faflack, 2009, p. 53

According to Armando & Belhoste (2018, pp. 6–8), the true history of Mesmer, of Mesmer's version of 'animal magnetism', and of the rationale, conduct, investigations, experimentation, and findings of the 1784 Royal Commissions has been seriously distorted by the modern ("cherry picking") concentration upon "the transformations of animal magnetism after 1820 [in relation to] hypnotism", and, especially, upon "the elements of continuity and analogy between mesmerism [sic] the various versions of psychoanalysis".

Consequently, to accurately understand the contemporary significance of the Commissions' work, and the matters that they severally and collectively examined (and, as well, those which they did not) it is important to identify the wide range of significant tensions, disputes, and circumstances prevailing at the time, which prompted the need for an official investigation of the particular nature and type that was undertaken, and the sort of (implicit) issues – in addition to the more specific questions of medicine and of science – that their inquiries would, hopefully, address.

Moreover, in order to gain a balanced understanding of the contemporary significance of the Commissions – as stand-alone historical events – appointed at a specific time, in specific circumstances, with specific goals and, further, in order to apprehend the nature of their investigations, their findings, and the immediate consequences of their reports, a complex of different factors need to be examined (as has been suggested by Craver & Darnden, 2013):

From the perspective of a given phenomenon, one can look down to the entities and activities composing it. One can look up to the higher-level mechanisms of which it is a component. One can look back to the mechanisms that come before it or by which it developed. One can look forward to what comes after it. [And, finally] one can look around to see the wider context with which it operates.

— p. 163

=== Tensions within the royal family ===
Prior to his arrival in Paris in 1777 – with a letter of recommendation from Chancellor von Kaunitz of the Habsburg monarchy to the Austrian Ambassador to France, the Comte de Mercy-Argenteau (who, in turn, introduced Mesmer to Jean-Baptiste Le Roy (1720–1800), the Director of the Academy of Sciences) – Mesmer was already known to Marie Antoinette.

At the urging of her two closest friends, Marie-Paule Angélique d’Albert de Luynes (1744–1781), "the Duchesse de Chaulnes" and Marie Thérèse Louise de Savoie-Carignan (1749–1792), "the Princess of Lamballe", both of whom "had benefited from Mesmer's treatment", Marie Antoinette had been able to arrange for both Mesmer and d'Eslon to be officially "interviewed" by (an otherwise unidentified) representative of the King on 14 March 1781 (Walmsley, 1967, p. 267). At the conclusion of the interview, Mesmer reluctantly agreed to the proposed conditions: that a number of his (previous and current) patients be examined by a team of "commissioners" – it was also stipulated that, as a "requirement" of the King, Mesmer was to "remain in France", until his "doctrines" and his "principles" had been thereby "established", and that he was "not [to] leave except by permission of the King" – and that, if the commissioners' reports were "favourable", the government would issue "a ministerial letter" to that effect (Pattie, 1994, p. 110).

Within two weeks Mesmer had rescinded his agreement, on the grounds that it had been made under duress, and a new "interview" was conducted, involving Mesmer, d'Eslon, the unidentified bureaucrat, and the Minister of State, Jean-Frédéric Phélypeaux de Maurepas.

The Minister ... began by saying that the King, informed of Mesmer's dislike of being investigated by commissioners, wished to excuse him from that formality and would grant him a life annuity of 20,000 French livres and pay 10,000 livres a year for the instruction of students, of whom three were to be selected by the government. "The rest of the benefits would be granted when the government's students recognize the utility of the discovery".

— Pattie, 1994, p. 111

Once again, Mesmer rejected the offer made on behalf of the King; and, having been told that the King's decision was final, and given that the impetus for the first interview had come from the Queen, Mesmer wrote an extraordinary letter (translated at Pattie, 1994, pp. 112–115), the nature of which would have meant imprisonment in the Bastille, if it had been written 20 years earlier.

Meditating [on the Minister's use of the word "final",] Mesmer returned to his clinic and put his name to what would surely be one of the most extraordinary letters ever written to a queen of France [who also shared his "native land"] even if he had sent it privately. Instead, he had it printed, [be]rating her in public about the offer [that had been] made in her name and giving her an ultimatum.

So, there were many reasons for the 1784 Commission to satisfy the (French) interests of the King, rather than the (Austrian) interests of his queen.

=== Social impact ===
It is already more than six years since Animal Magnetism was announced to Europe, particularly in France and in this Capital. But it is only over about the last two years that it has been of particular interested to a considerable number of citizens and that it has become the object of public discussion. Never had a more extraordinary question divided the opinions of an enlightened nation.

— The "Franklin Commission's" Report to the Royal Academy of Sciences (September 1784, emphasis added)

Mesmer's overall stress on the quest for "harmony" as a therapeutic outcome and, especially, given the demonstrated fact that the effects of his 'animal magnetism' – predicated upon the presence of a force analogous to gravity – were equally demonstrated by all, regardless of age, gender, class, race, intellect, etc., was an important influence on many of the moves (and 'movers') within French society towards democracy and greater equality.

=== Festering political issues ===
The increasingly unpopular ancien régime was under considerable pressure from many quarters; and, within five years of the Commissions' Reports, the French Revolution had broken out. The storming of the Bastille took place on 14 July 1789; and four years later, King Louis XVI was executed on 21 January 1793, and his Queen, Marie Antoinette, the daughter of Empress Maria Theresa, and the sister of Emperor Joseph II, was executed on 16 October 1793.

=== Professional tensions ===
Apart from the wider issue of having to evaluate and decide how to deal with those within the medical profession "who saw animal magnetism as an interesting therapeutic resource" (Armando & Belmonte, 2018, p. 13) – namely, the boundary disputes between the conventional therapeutic practices of the sorts that Brockliss and Jones (1997) usefully identify as lying within the established "medical penumbra" (pp. 230–283) and the novel and innovative practices at the "frontier" that were (potentially) responsible for the "expansion of the medicable" (pp. 441–459) – there were also significant tensions, differences, and boundary disputes between the more theory- and principle-centred Paris Faculty of Medicine (formed some five centuries earlier), and the more practitioner-centred Royal Society of Medicine (formed just 5 years earlier), the "primary function" of which was "to evaluate patent medicines and, by extension, new forms of therapy" (Forrest, 1999, pp. 18–19).

=== Scientific issues ===
In a prevailing atmosphere of "[an overall] redefinition of frontiers in the legitimacy of knowledge" – and, in relation to Mesmer's claims, a redefinition "which did not necessarily match the public popularity that they attracted" (Zanetti, 2018), p. 59) – the issue of the existence (or not) of a substantial "magnetic fluid" and/or "animal magnetism" required resolution.

=== Medical issues ===
At a time when, in relation to "healers and healing", the conglomerate of "physicians, empirics, surgeons, apothecaries, folk healers, and religious personalities all vied with each other (as well as worked together) for medical legitimacy and patients" (Broomhall, 2004, p. 5), Mesmer was not only a "foreign national", but also one that had no affiliation of any kind with any known professional medical association within France (or elsewhere in Europe); and, as a consequence, his professional conduct, his medical practice, his medico-commercial enterprises, and his therapeutic endeavours were not regulated in any way.

Moreover, the efficacy of Mesmer's interventions had never been objectively tested, neither the agency nor the (pre- and post-intervention) veracity of his supposed "cures" had ever been objectively verified, and, finally, in relation to the presenting conditions of those with (supposedly) 'real' ailments, the question of whether the pre-intervention conditions of each case were of "organic" or "psychogenic" origins had never been objectively determined.

=== Religious issues ===
As discussed at considerable length by Spanos and Gottlieb (1979) there were not only a wide range of controversial secular and religious issues relating to the similarities and differences between the induction, manifestations, and immediate and long-term consequences of the "crises" that were (sporadically) produced by the 'magnetic' interventions, and the exorcisms of the Roman Catholic Church, but, also, of greater significance, to the occasional (apparently veridical) reports of post-magnetic "clairvoyance" – a condition that was one of the classic indications for an exorcism whenever it was considered to be "demonically inspired" (as distinct from those cases in which it was considered to be "divinely inspired" (Spanos and Gottlieb, 1979, p. 538)).

== The two Commissions ==
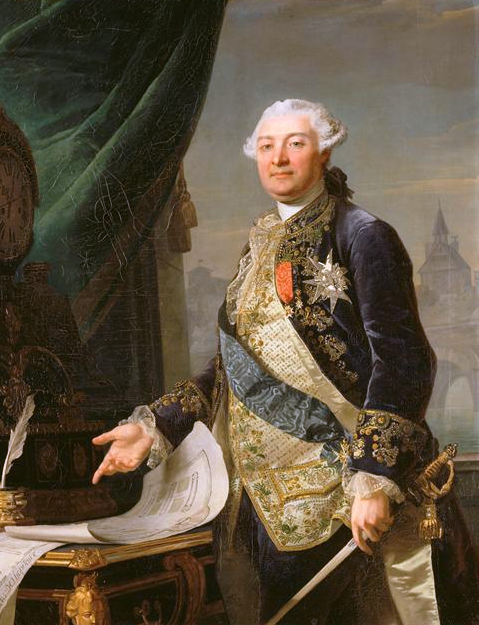
Baron de Breteuil (c.1787)

The Commissions were appointed in early 1784 by the Baron de Breteuil, Secretary of State for the King's Household and Minister of the Department of Paris at the command of King Louis XVI.

At length [the matter of Animal Magnetism] was thought to deserve the attention of government, and a committee, partly physicians, and partly members of the royal academy of Sciences, with doctor Benjamin Franklin at their head, were appointed to examine it. M. Mesmer refused to have any communication with these gentlemen; but M. Deslon, the most considerable of his pupils, consented to disclose to them his principles, and assist them in their enquiries.

— William Godwin (1785)

=== "Franklin Commission" ===
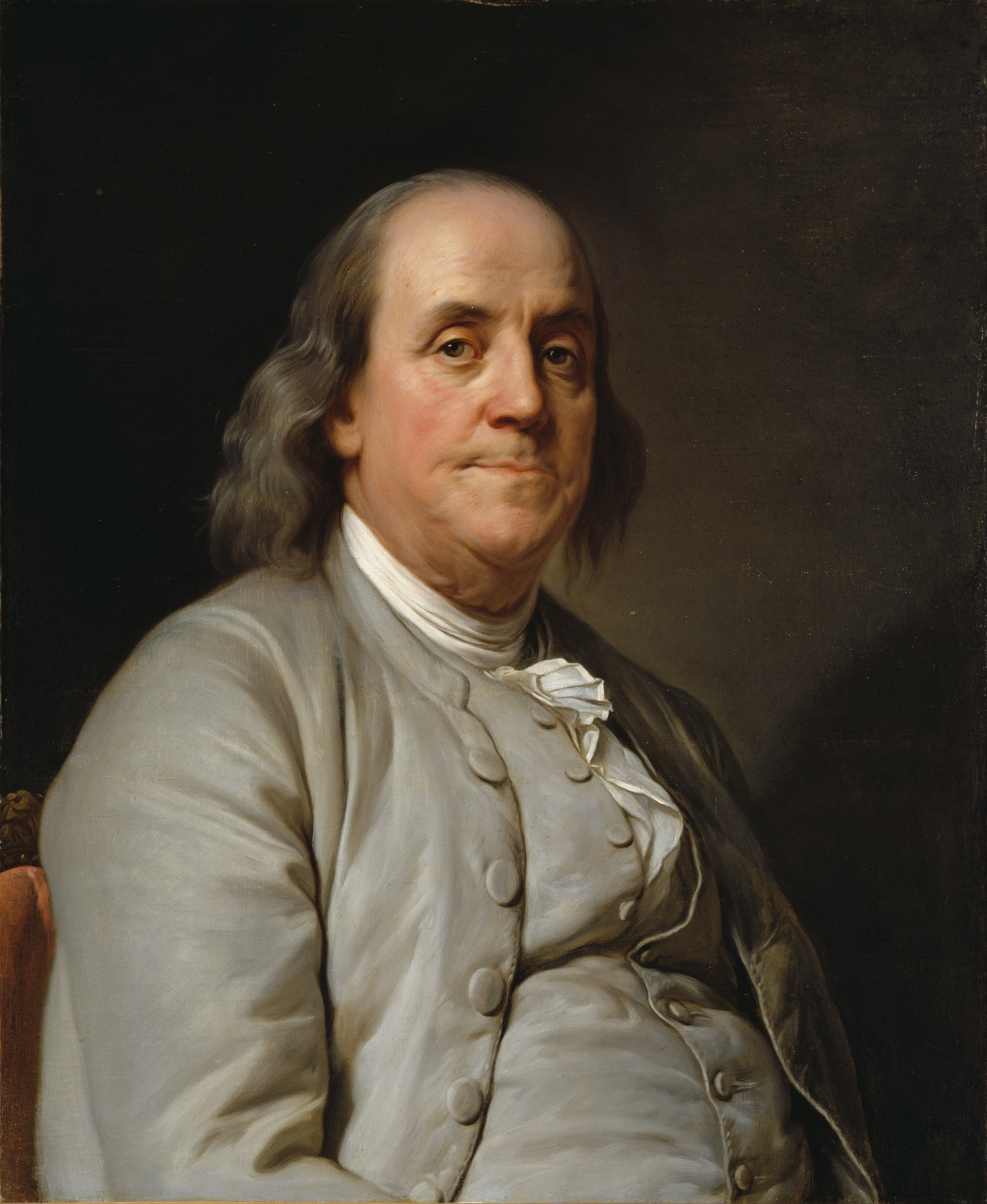
Benjamin Franklin, 1778

The first of the two Royal Commissions, usually referred to as the "Franklin Commission", was appointed on 12 March 1784. It was composed of four physicians from the Paris Faculty of Medicine – the physician and chemist Jean d'Arcet, the physician and close friend of Franklin, Joseph-Ignace Guillotin (1738–1814), the Hôtel-Dieu physician, Michel-Joseph Majault (1714–1790), and the Professor (of physiology and pathology) Charles Louis Sallin – and, at the request of those four physicians, five scientists from the Royal Academy of Sciences – the astronomer (and first mayor of Paris) Jean Sylvain Bailly (1736–1793), the geographer, cartographer, and former governor of St. Domingue, Gabriel de Bory de Saint-Vincent (1720–1801), Benjamin Franklin (1706–1790), the chemist and biologist Antoine Lavoisier (1743–1794), and the physicist (and expert on things electrical), Jean-Baptiste Le Roy, the Director of the Academy of Sciences.

If the effects of magnetism ... can be as well explained by the effects of an excited or exalted imagination, all the efforts of the Commissioners must be directed to distinguishing in "magnetism" ... [per medium of] a single conclusive experiment [une seule expérience concluante] ... those things that are related to physical causes [causes physiques] from those that are related to [psychological] causes [causes morales], [that is,] the effects of a real agent [les effets d'un agent réel] from those due to the imagination ...
By magnetising people without their knowledge and by persuading them that they are being magnetised when they are not ... one will obtain separately the effects of magnetism and those of the imagination and, from this, one will be able to conclude what should be attributed to the one and what to the other.

— Antoine Lavoisier (1784).

Despite the contemporary and modern salience given to Benjamin Franklin – who, as the most eminent of the commission's eleven members, was recognized as its titular head – it is a matter of record that Franklin, then aged 78, and otherwise engaged in his duties as the U.S. Ambassador to France, had little involvement in any of the commission's investigations. In particular, this was because his own ill-health prevented him from leaving his residence in Passy and participating in the Paris-centred investigations – although the commission's Report does note that several experiments were conducted at Franklin's Passy residence in Franklin's presence.

In addition to his general scientific interests in electricity and (terrestrial) magnetism, "Franklin had known Mesmer for some years prior to the investigation and was familiar with the practice of animal magnetism", and, on occasion, he and Mesmer had even "dined together" – and, also there was "no doubt [that] Franklin's curiosity was aroused by the mere connotation of the term animal magnetism, for it implied something in connexion with electricity, and [Franklin] himself had already made [25 years earlier] a number of experiments on the effect of electric discharges on paralytics, epileptics, etc." (Duveen & Klickstein, 1955, p. 287).

=== "Society Commission" ===
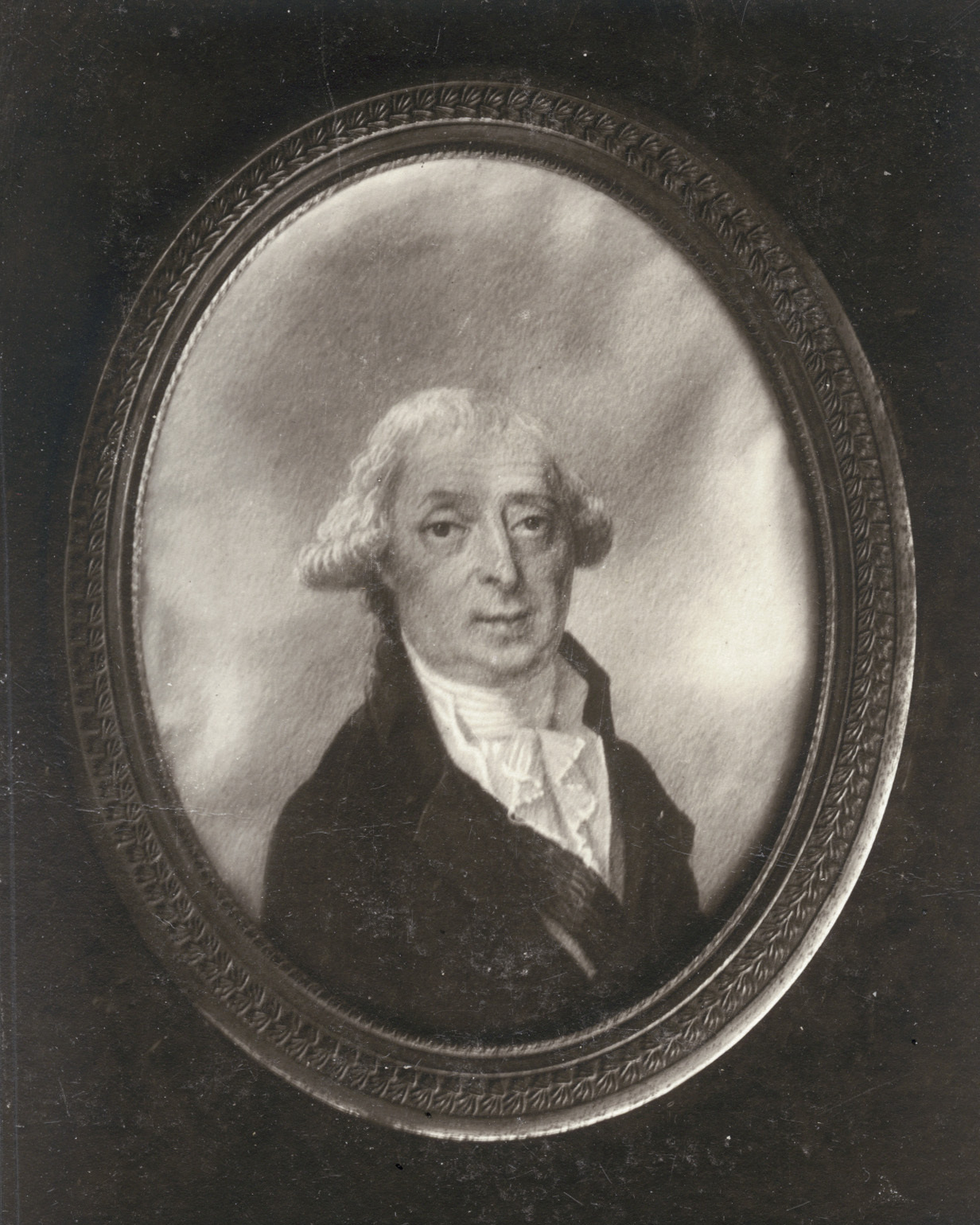
Charles-Louis-François Andry (1741–1829)

The second of the two Royal Commissions, usually referred to as the "Society Commission", was appointed on 5 April 1784. It was composed of five eminent physicians from the Royal Society of Medicine – the physician and one of the first members of the Royal Society, Charles-Louis-François Andry (1741–1829), the physician Claude-Antoine Caille (b. 1743), the botanist Antoine Laurent de Jussieu (1748–1836), the physician, Collège de France professor, one of the original directors of the Royal Society, and committed advocate of the therapeutic applications of electricity, Pierre Jean Claude Mauduyt de La Varenne (1732–1792), and the physician and Professor of chemistry in the Collège de France, Pierre-Isaac Poissonnier (1720–1798) – and, as Pattie remarks (1994, p. 156), "the impression given by [their] report is that the commissioners were busy practitioners who wanted to devote no more time to the project than was necessary".

Although the investigations of the "Society Commission" were less thorough and less detailed than those of the "Franklin Commission" they were essentially of the same nature, and it is a matter of fact that neither Commission examined Mesmer's practices – they only examined the practices of d'Eslon.

== Franz Mesmer ==
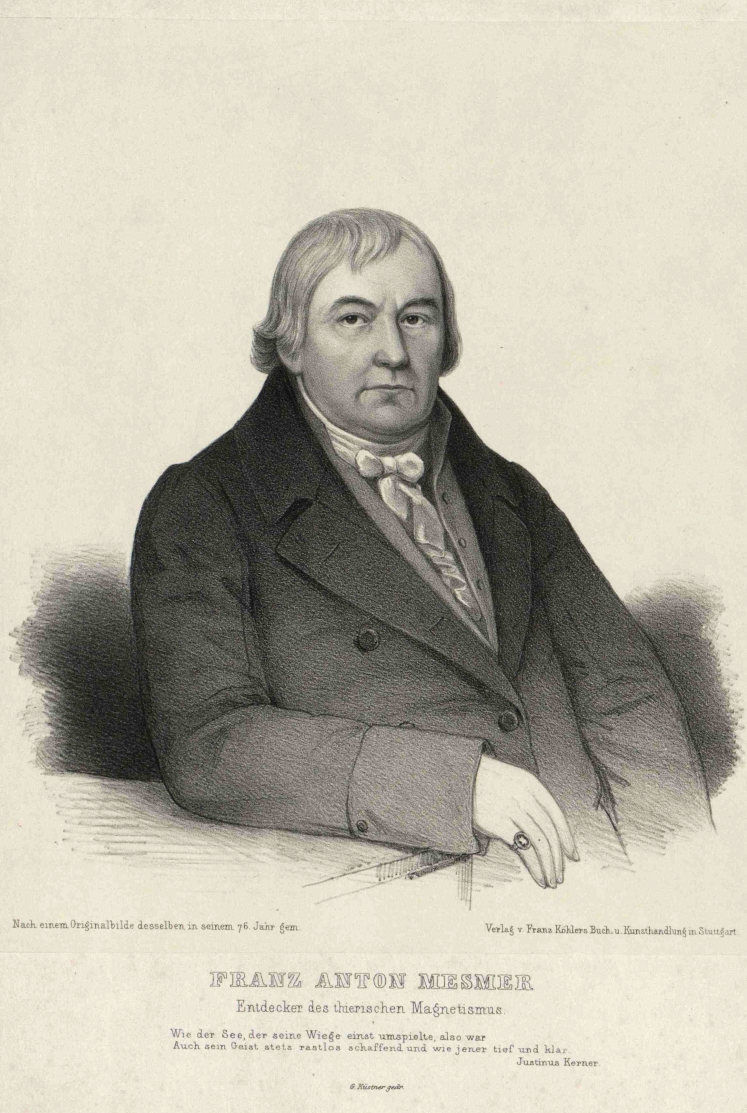
Franz Mesmer c.1800

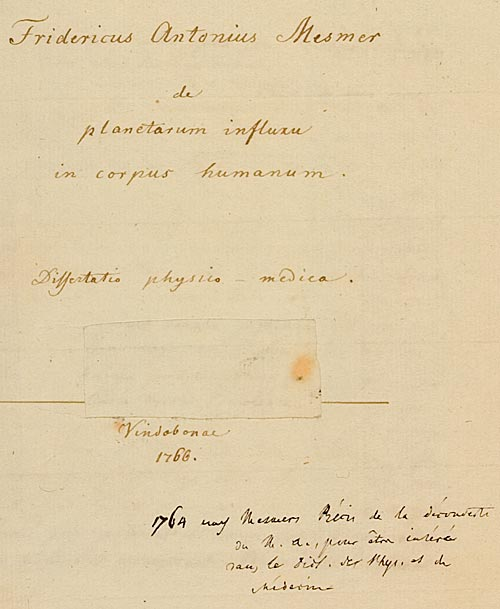
Title page of Mesmer's (1766) dissertation

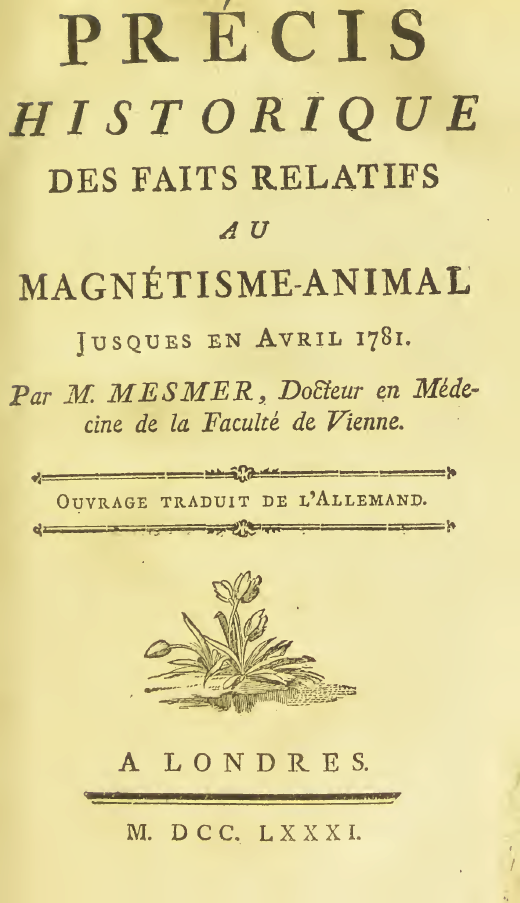
Mesmer's Précis Historique (1781)

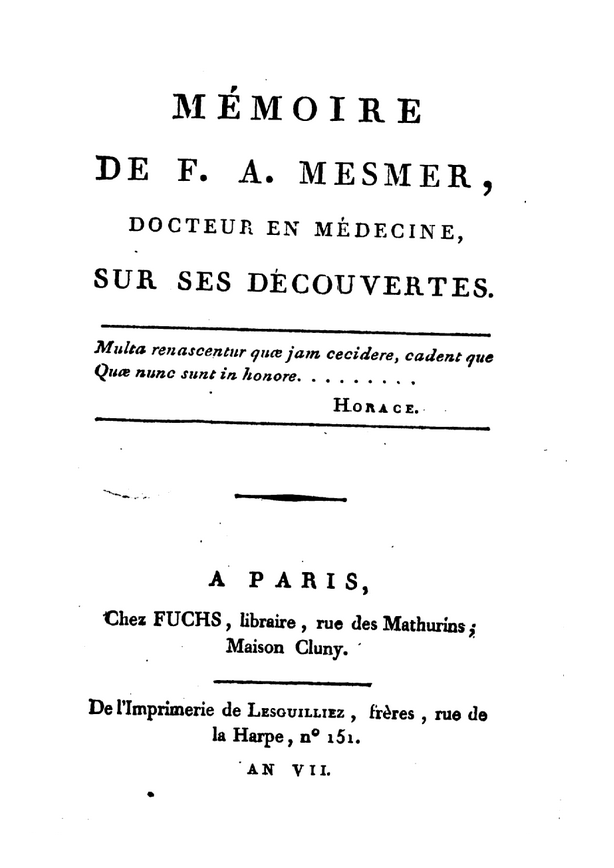
Mesmer's Mémoire (1799)

Franz Anton Mesmer (1734–1815), born in Swabia, having first studied law at Dillingen and Ingolstadt universities, transferred to the University of Vienna and began a study of medicine, graduating Medicinae Doctor (M.D.) at the age of 32, in 1766: his doctoral dissertation (Mesmer, 1766) had the official title A Physico-Medical Dissertation on the Influence of the Planets.

Although he was made a member of the Bavarian Academy of Sciences and Humanities in 1775, and, despite his M.D. qualification, there is no record of Mesmer ever having been accepted as a member of any medical "learned society" anywhere in Europe at any time.

Mesmer left Austria in 1777, in controversial circumstances, following his treatment of the young Austrian pianist Maria Theresia von Paradis for her blindness, and established himself, in Paris, in February 1778. He spent several years in Paris itself – during which time he published his Précis historique' (i.e., Mesmer, 1781) – interspersed with time spent in various parts of France, a complete absence from France (1792–1798), a return to France in 1798, and his final departure from France in 1802.

While in France it was his habit to travel to the town of Spa in Belgium to "take the waters"; and he was enjoying an extended stay at Spa when the reports of the two Royal Commissions were released. Mesmer lived for another 31 years after the Royal Commissions. He died at the age of 80, in Meersburg, in the Grand Duchy of Baden, on 5 March 1815.

=== Positioner of a concept ===
Rather than being the "inventor" of "a technique", as some (mis)represent the circumstances, it is clear that Mesmer's significance was in his "positioning" of an overarching "concept" (or "construct") through his creation and development – using analogies with gravity, terrestrial magnetism, and hydraulics (as they were understood at the time) – of "an explanatory model to represent the way that healers had been healing people for thousands of years" (Yeates, 2018, p. 48).

The (oft-forgotten) value and long-term significance of Mesmer's "positioning", according to Rosen (1959, pp. 7–8), is that "Mesmer's theory [in] itself ... diverted attention from the phenomena produced by animal magnetism to the agent alleged to produce them"; yet, both 1784 Commissions side-stepped this issue, and "simply ascribed the magnetic cures to imagination, but never bothered to ask how imagination can produce a cure".

=== Mesmer's "protoscience", rather than "pseudoscience" ===
According to Tatar (1990, p. 49), rather than Mesmer's proposal being some sort of "occult theory", "[Mesmer] actually remained well within the bounds of eighteenth-century thought when he formulated his theories" and "the theories [that Mesmer] invoked to explain [the agency of "animal magnetism"] fit squarely into the frame of eighteenth-century cosmology": and, moreover, "to consider animal magnetism independently of the tradition out of which it emerged is to magnify its distinctively occult characteristics and to diminish in importance those features that mirror the scientific and philosophical temper of the age in which it flourished."

Rosen (1959, pp. 4–5) noted that, it was clear that

Mesmer's theory of animal magnetism ... [within which] he employed the term magnetism to characterize a reciprocal relationship between the forces of nature and the human body, and [which] conceived of nature as the harmony of these relations in action ... contains a number of themes and theoretical concepts common to the medical world of the eighteenth century ... [which] is evident, for example, in his interpretation of disease as a disharmony attributable to a functional disturbance of the nervous fluid ... [which is a] concept ... derived from the ancient humoral pathology with its doctrines of dyscrasia and critical days, from the irritability theory of Albrecht von Haller (1708–1777), and from the excitation theory of John Brown (1735–1788).

In other words, as a product of its time, Mesmer's enterprise was one of protoscience, rather than being one of pseudoscience – or, even, one of fringe science.

=== A concept that must not be reified ===
It is clear from his Mémoire (1799) that Mesmer was very aware of the human propensity – in the normal, conventional use of language (la langue de convention) – to speak of "properties" or "qualities" (i.e., these "metaphysical abstractions", illusions de la méthaphysique), as if they were "substances": in Mesmer's words, "substantivise the properties", substantisia les propriétés (Mesmer 1799, pp. 15–17). – in other words, "reification", in the manner of Whitehead's "fallacy of misplaced concreteness".

Mesmer was also well aware of the extent to which, through the "distortion" caused by these "substantive words" (mot substantif) – which inappropriately "personified" (personnifia) these metaphysical abstractions (p. 16) – one is induced to believe in the actual physical existence of the "substance" itself. Given these observations, Mesmer was most emphatic in his continuous warnings that his abstract "principles" should not be "substantivised".

It is significant that Mesmer (1799) describes how, once he had formulated the abstract, overarching (metaphorical) construct/concept of "animal magnetism" as the therapeutic agent (a quarter of a century earlier) – and with his hope that this newly described "principle of action" (principe de action), when considered as an agent, "could become a means of healing and, even, one of preserving/defending oneself against disease" (p. 7, Mesmer's emphasis). – the primary focus of his enterprise had become the threefold quest for the acquisition of an understanding of:

1. how to rouse (and maintain) this agent, by every possible means – and acquire the knowledge of how, so-roused, it might be therapeutically harnessed in the most efficacious fashion (Mesmer, 1799, p. 48);
2. (given that the agent's therapeutic effects were observed to be gradual, rather than instantaneous) the "obstacles" that typically divert, disturb, or impede the agent's capacity to attain the optimal treatment outcomes – and, once these "obstacles" had been identified, determine appropriate ways to "clear them away" (de connoître et lever les obstacles qui peuvent troubler ou empêcher son action, p. 48); and
3. the natural pathway along which the agent's therapeutic effects are realized, so that, in its application, these outcomes can be systematically anticipated – meaning that, with this knowledge, the (otherwise random) clinical applications can be controlled, regulated, and incrementally applied in a systematic way, until the target goal of a "cure" is attained (p. 49).

=== Based on natural principles ===
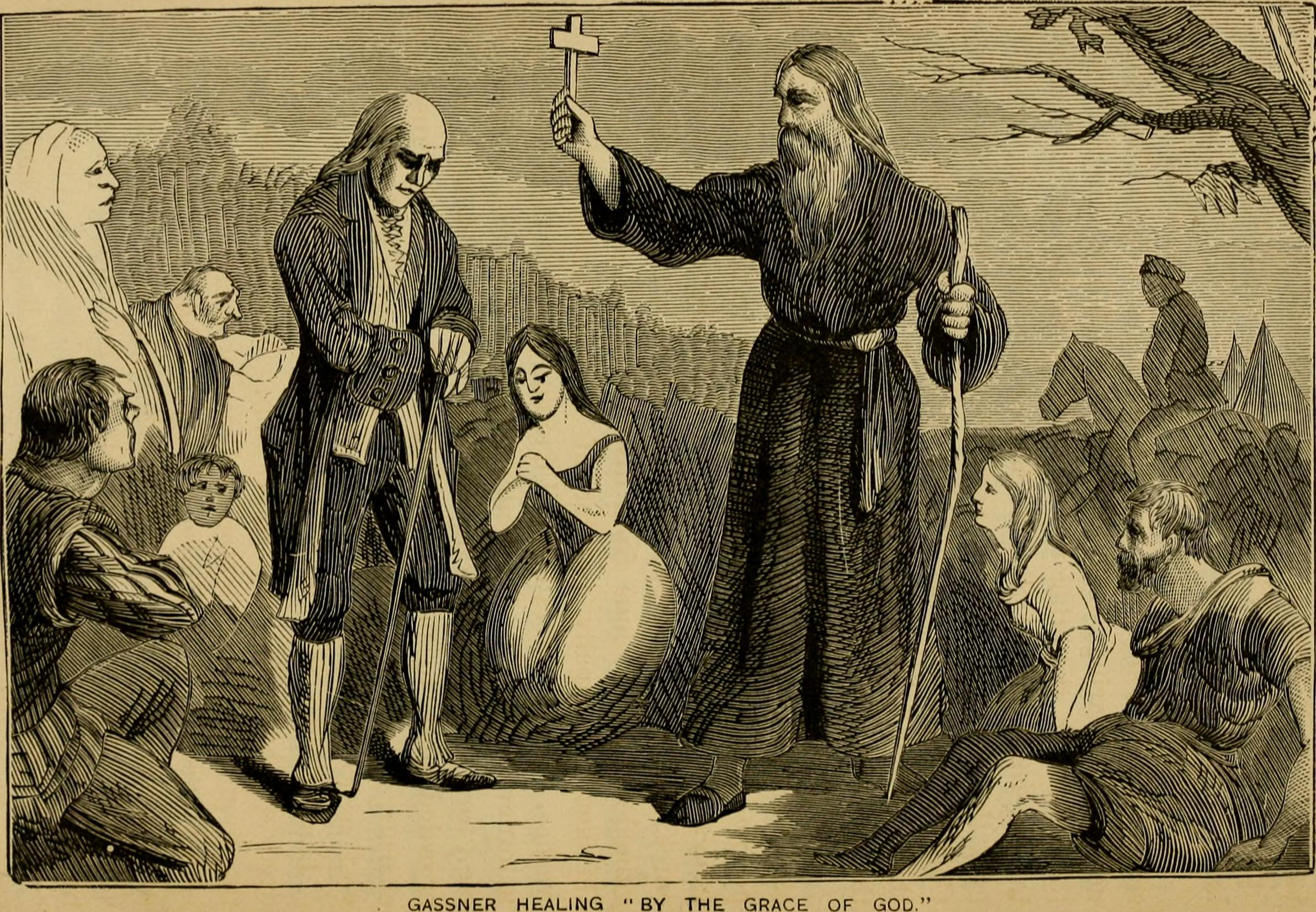
Gassner, the exorcist, in action

Mesmer held the materialist position – that his therapies, which involved easily understood, systematic natural principles, were "physiological", rather than "psychological" interventions – in contrast to the supernatural positions of, say, the exorcist Johann Joseph Gassner (1727–1779),

By contrast with many "faith healers", [Gassner] had a quasi-scientific method of diagnosis, according to which he separated diseases that should be treated by a physician from those that he should treat. He first admonished the patient that faith in the name of Jesus was essential. He then obtained consent to use the method of "trial" exorcism. He entreated the Devil to defy Jesus by producing the patient's symptoms. If the convulsions or other symptoms appeared, Gassner believed they were the work of the Devil; he proceeded to exorcise the responsible demon. If symptoms failed to appear, he could not attribute them to a demon and sent the patient to a physician.

— Ernest Hilgard, (1980).

the mystic José Custódio de Faria, a.k.a. "Abbé Faria" (1756–1819), and the magnetists, such as d'Eslon, and, later, Charles Lafontaine (1803–1892), whose demonstrations of "animal magnetism" were attended by James Braid in November 1841,

Mesmer's approach to healing and his healing theory were physically oriented. His explanation of the phenomena of animal magnetism was consistently formulated in terms of matter and motion, and he believed that every aspect of animal magnetism could sooner or later be verified through physical experimentation and research.

— Crabtree, 1993, p. 51

When Mesmer took a patient, his first concern was to determine whether the ailment was organic or functional. If it was organic, the result of physical damage to the tissue, he considered it, following [his] Proposition 23, beyond the aid of animal magnetism. If it was functional, a physiological disorder affected by the nerves, it fell within the class of diseases he felt uniquely qualified to handle with his therapeutic technique.

— Buranelli, 1975, pp. 107–108

== Charles d'Eslon ==
Charles d'Eslon (1750–1786), "a disciple of the [eminent French] surgeon J.L. Petit", was a docteur-régent of the Paris Faculty of Medicine, and the one-time personal physician to the King's brother, Charles Philippe, Count of Artois – who, later (following the Bourbon Restoration in France) became King Charles X.

=== Association with Mesmer ===
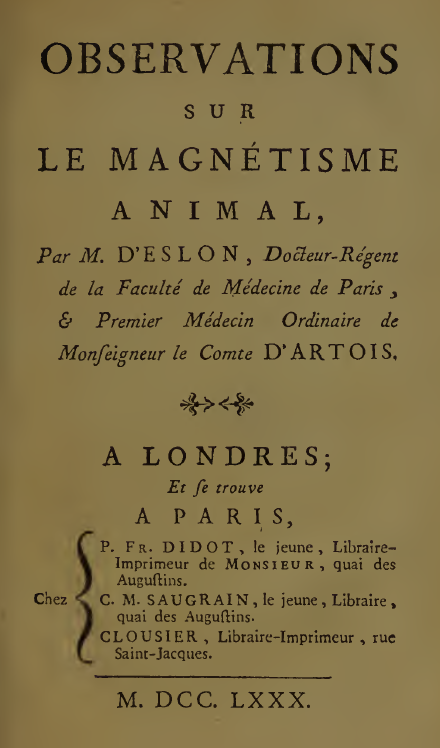
d'Eslon's Observations (1780)

D'Eslon, a one-time patient, pupil, and associate of Mesmer, published a work on Mesmer's version of animal magnetism (while still associated with Mesmer), Observations sur le Magnétisme Animal (1780), which presented details of 18 cases (10 male, 8 female) treated by Mesmer.

In stressing the efficacy of Mesmer's "animal magnetism" interventions, d'Eslon defended (at p. 124) the absence of clear explanations (from Mesmer) of the mechanism through which "animal magnetism" effects its "cures" with an observation that, although the purgative actions of rhubarb and "Shir-Khesht manna" (or "purgative manna") are well known to the medical profession, the mechanisms involved are not; and, so, in these cases, "facts" and "experience" are "our only guides" – and, in a similar fashion, asserts d'Eslon, "in relation to Animal Magnetism, it is the same, I don't know how it works, but I do know that it does work". D'Eslon also directly addressed the charge that Mesmer had "discovered" nothing, and that the "extraordinary things" (des choses extraordinaires) that Mesmer had demonstrably effected were due to his "captivation of the imagination" (en séduisant l'imagination), with the comment that

If [it were to be true that] Mesmer had no other secret than that he has been able to make the imagination exert an influence upon health, would he not still be a wonderful doctor? If treatment by the use of the imagination is the best treatment, why do we not make use of it?

— 1780, pp. 46–47

=== Ostracism ===
On 7 October 1780 – still associated with Mesmer and still a member of the Paris Faculty of Medicine – d'Eslon made an official request "that an investigation of the authenticity and efficacy of Mesmer's claims and cures be made. The Faculté rejected his plea, and in refusing accused [d'Eslon] personally of misdemeanour".

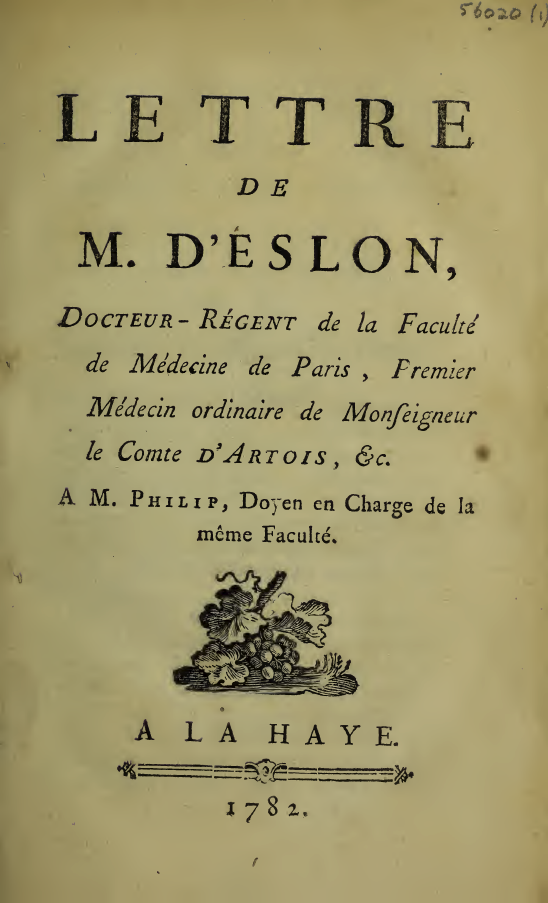
d'Eslon's Lettre (1782)

On 15 May 1782, d'Eslon presented the Faculty with his arguments in the form of a 144-page pamphlet; and then, "on 26 October 1782, [d'Eslon] was finally struck from the [Faculty's] roster and forbidden to attend any meeting for a period of two years" (Duveen & Klickstein, 1955, p. 286).

=== Post-Mesmer ===
In late 1782, and eighteen months before the Royal Commission, d'Eslon had (acrimoniously) parted ways with Mesmer; and, despite a brief reconciliation, the relationship was terminated in late 1783. On 28 December 1783, d'Eslon wrote a letter to the Journal de Paris, which not only described the difficulties he had experienced with Mesmer, but also announced that he was opening his own (entirely independent) clinic.

Following his break with Mesmer, d'Eslon not only launched his own clinical operation on his break with Mesmer, d'Eslon took all of the patients he had brought to Mesmer with him – but also began teaching his own theories and practices (i.e., rather than those of Mesmer). According to d'Eslon's own account (d'Eslon, 1784b, pp. 25–26), Mesmer had taught 300 students, 160 of whom were medical men (médecins), and d'Eslon himself had taught 160 medical men (this group included 21 members of the Paris Faculty of Medicine).

Given that many of those who had privately paid Mesmer for the details of "the secret" were greatly dissatisfied, and had "[justifiably] accused [Mesmer] of having enunciated a theory which was merely a collection of obscure principles" (Binet & Féré, 1888, p. 13), it seems that d'Eslon's version was little better. Greatly confused by d'Eslon's version of "the secret", d'Eslon's student and associate, François Amédée Doppet, is said to have remarked that those to whom d'Eslon had revealed "the secret" doubted it even more than those to whom it had not been revealed.

It was under these circumstances that a decision was made to investigate the work of d'Eslon – although he was already ostracized from the Paris Faculty of Medicine – when "d'Eslon, through influential friends, and tact, and other favourable circumstances, procured [the commissions'] establishment [specifically] to investigate animal magnetism as practised in his own clinic" (Gauld, 1992, p. 7, emphasis added).

=== Last days ===
Once d'Eslon had been expelled from the rank of docteur-régent, his membership of the Faculty of Medicine was never reinstated; and unlike Mesmer, he remained in Paris following the publication of the reports of the two Commissions. Although apparently in good health in the preceding months, he died somewhat suddenly in Paris, on 21 August 1786, at the age of 47, from a complex of disorders including pneumonia, a malignant fever (une fièvre maligne), and renal colic.

== Aspects of Mesmer's evolving practices ==
=== Mesmer's early experiments with magnets ===
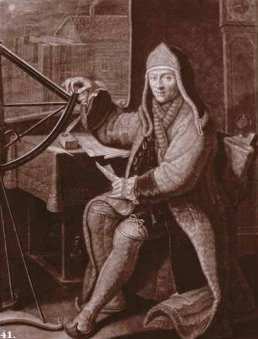
Maximillian Hell

It is significant that Mesmer, initially impressed by the therapeutic enterprises of the Jesuit astronomer, explorer, and healer Maximilian Hell (1720–1792) – which involved the application of steel magnets that had been specifically shaped either to fit particular body contours, or to match the actual dimensions of a specific organ (e.g., the liver) – and, immediately recognizing the prima facie plausibility of Hell's approach, purchased a number of steel magnets from Hell in 1774 and began applying them to his patients; however, as Pattie reports (1994, p. 2), Mesmer "had [entirely] abandoned the use of magnets" by 1776, because his own clinical experimentation had proved them to be utterly useless.

By 1779, Mesmer (1779, pp. 34–35) was expressing his concern that many had "confused" – such as the "Berlin Academy" in 1775 – and were continuing to "confuse" the "properties" of his (abstract/theoretical) magnétisme animal with those of an actual physical magnet (l'aimant): objects of which, he stressed, he had only ever spoken of as possible "conductors" of "animal magnetism".

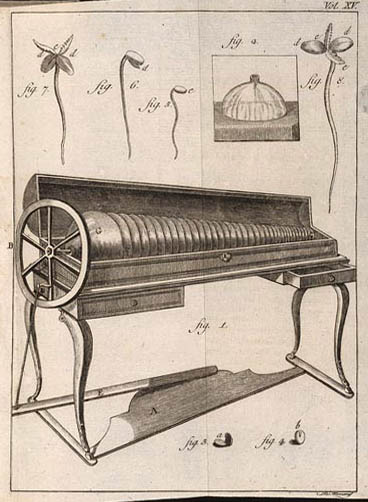
Benjamin Franklin's glass Armonica (c.1776)

"The Fixed Stars, the Frontier to the Beyond" from the album Music of the Spheres (William Zeitler, 2003)
A sample of glass Armonica music.

He argued that from this "confusion" of his "animal magnetism" with "mineral magnetism", his use of magnets – which, although "useful", were always "imperfect', unless they had been applied according to la théorie du Magnétisme animal – was being consistently misrepresented and misunderstood.

=== The glass armonica ===
Mesmer developed particular theatrical therapeutic rituals, often accompanied by the sounds of the Glass Armonica – an instrument invented by Benjamin Franklin himself – that were associated with a wide range of (figurative) magnetic connotations, such as the use of "magnetic wands", and the treatment tub known as "the baquet", which, in the view of Yeates (2018, p. 48), were "obviously, designed to amplify each subject's 'response expectancy' (Kirsch, 1997, etc.) via impressive 'metonymical acts' (Topley, 1976, p. 254)".

=== The "baquet" ===
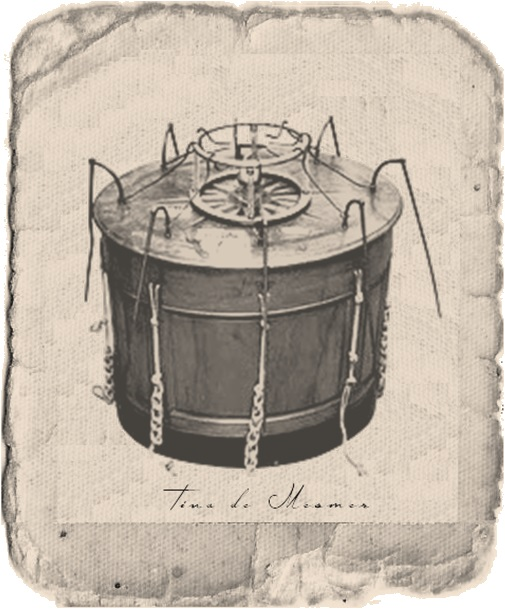
The sole remaining example of Mesmer's baquet: at the Museum of the History of Medicine and Pharmacy at Lyon.

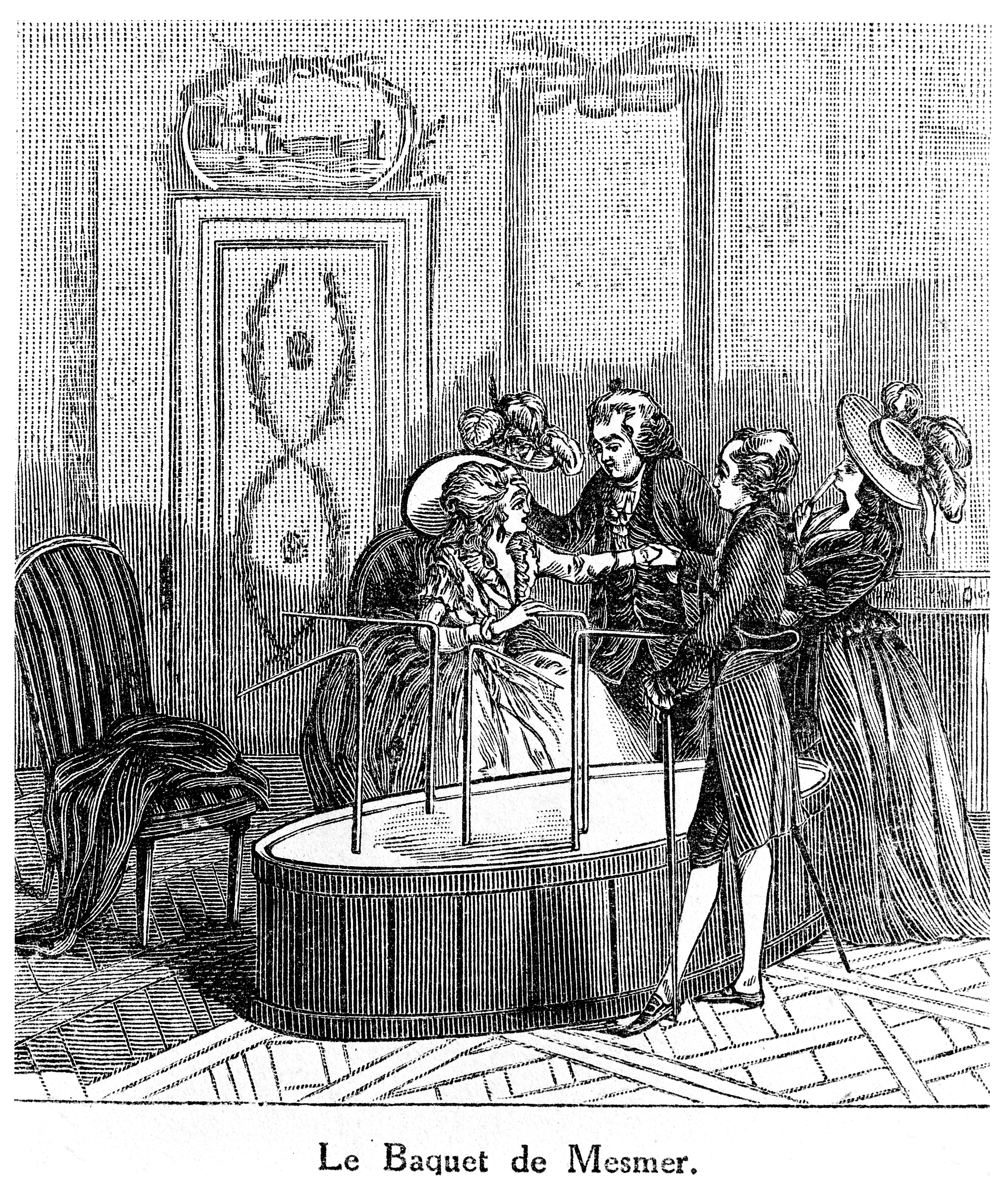
Three of Mesmer's subjects, with linked hands, at the baquet

The baquet (lit. 'tub') was a device of Mesmer's design, that he had constructed by analogy with the newly invented "Leyden bottle" – i.e., "the first electric condenser [i.e. capacitor] in history" (Morabito, 2019, p. 90) – which was "supposed by analogy to 'store' animal magnetism" (Forrest, 1999, p. 20).

In its initial conception, Mesmer's "baquet" was "a vat containing bottles of magnetized water from which steel bars escaped through which the 'magnetization' took place in the [subjects or patients], who were arranged around the tub holding their hands" (Morabito, 2019, p. 90). According to Mesmer's own description, in the (undated) Catechism that he had delivered exclusively to his followers,

[The baquet] is a vat about six to seven feet, more or less, in diameter by eighteen inches in height. There is a double bottom in the interior of this vat, in which fragments of broken bottles, gravel, stones, and sticks of pounded sulfur and iron filings are placed. All of this is filled with water and covered up with a floor nailed into the vat. On the surface of the lid, six inches in from the rim, one makes various holes in order to allow the passage of iron rods which are arranged so that one end penetrates the bottom of the vat and the other is directed, by means of a curve, over the pit of the stomach of the patient or other affected parts of the body.

Mesmer specifically stressed the primary importance of the patients' hand-holding as a factor in the "augmentation" of the force/quality of the power of the "animal magnetism".

Moreover, and significantly, Mesmer (separately) acknowledged that, if it was ever to come to pass that he had a suitable "establishment" – i.e., one with sufficient space available for all the assembled patients to hold hands – he would "abolish the use of baquets" (je supprimerois les baquets) and, as well, also significantly remarking that, "In general, I only use these little devices [baquets] when I am forced to do so" (En general, je n'use des petits moyens que lorsque j'y suis forcé).

== The "magnetic crisis" ==
One feature of Mesmer's methods ... was the "mesmeric crisis". Some patients, especially those suffering from more serious symptoms, experienced nervous trembling, nausea, occasionally delirium or convulsions. Mesmer regarded these as an inevitable accompaniment of the process of normalization of the flow of animal magnetism, and had special padded "crisis rooms" [salle de crises] in which patients could throw themselves about without hurting themselves, while Mesmer or his assistants gave them individual attention. The depth of the crisis naturally varied from case to case, but Mesmer insisted that some degree of crisis, no matter how slight or transient, would always be found if it was looked for carefully enough.

— Anthony Campbell, 1988, p. 36

Given Mesmer's regular (analogical) references throughout his works to the efficient grinding activities of smoothly functioning mills – speaking of how the windmills are driven by the wind, and watermills by the flow of water. – he usefully extended those analogies to explain the circumstances in which "crises" occur, especially in relation to the magnitude of the "crises": i.e., the dramatic circumstances of the sudden restoration of the lost function of a watermill installation – a direct consequence of the magnitude of the force of the flow of water that has been applied (through the currently stationary waterwheel) to the milling mechanism, which is, in and of itself, directly related to the extent to which the (now-operative) milling mechanism was formerly stationary, out of order, or, even, jammed:

Mesmer states that magnetism is to the bodily organs as the wind is to the windmill ... If the wind ceases to blow, the milling process comes to a halt, and should the cessation continue for long enough, the windmill may fall into disrepair or even ruin. The salvation of the miller comes when the wind begins to blow again, making the machinery of the windmill work again. ... [A] greater effort is required to start a windmill after it has stopped than to keep it going, especially if disrepair has set in. ... [In a similar fashion,] when animal magnetism ceases to course freely through the nervous system, the organs begin to malfunction and the whole physiology slows down. Fluids become stagnant and viscous and begin to block the blood vessels and other canals of the body. ... The symptoms become worse because the organs grow weaker as the obstructions grow larger and larger and vice versa. Mesmer thought the organs then must be galvanized into a greater effort than ever before to push the fluids through the natural channels, and it is animal magnetism that galvinizes them.

— Buranelli, 1975, p. 108

=== The Commissions' observations and description of d'Eslon's "magnetic crises" ===
Description of the Crises produced by d'Eslon's procedures ("Franklin Commission's" Report)

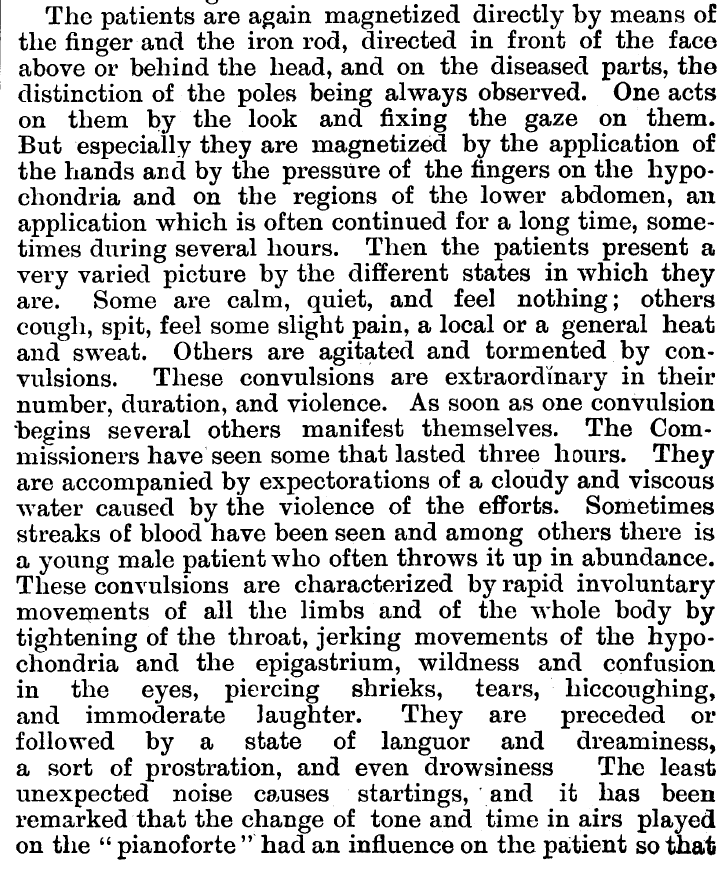
(first part)

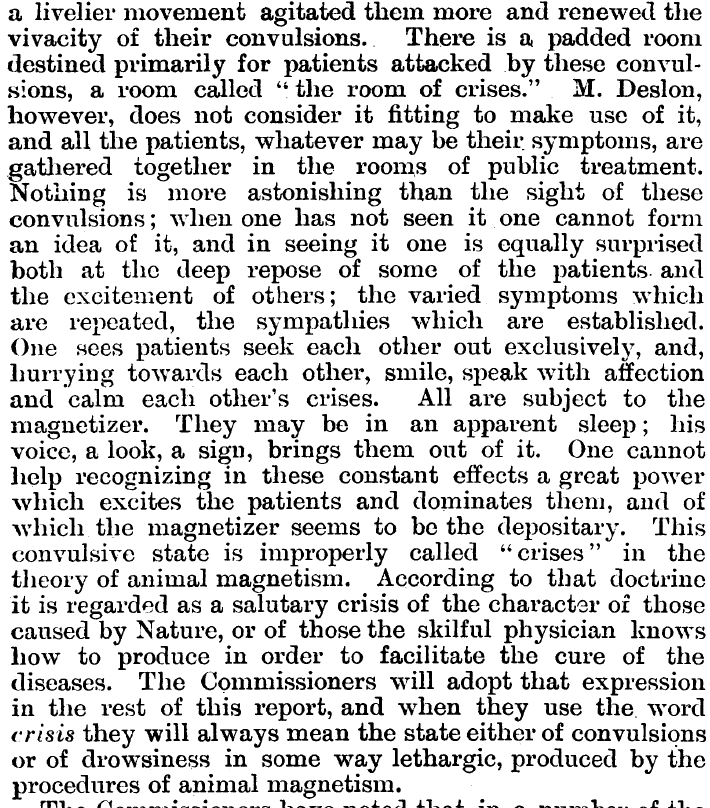
(second part)

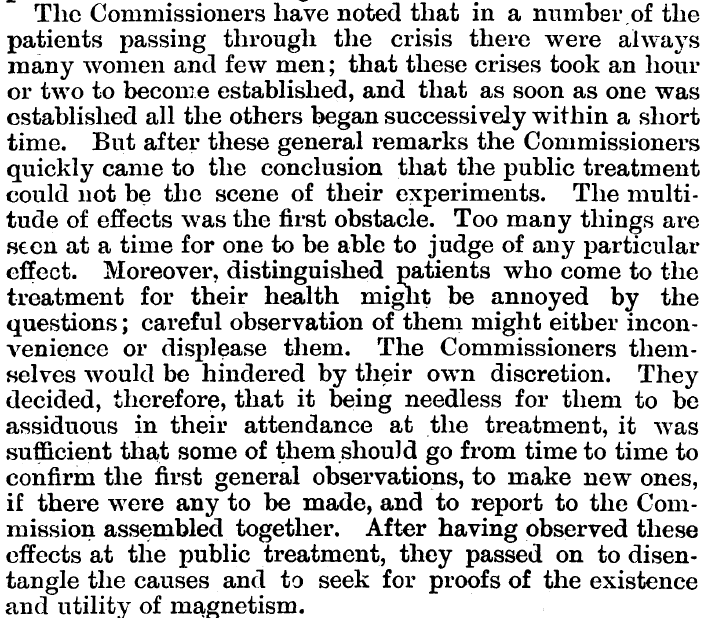
(third part)

=== The Commissions' remarks on d'Eslon's "magnetic crises" ===
Noting that some of those who were "magnetized" by d'Eslon over an extended time "fell into the convulsive movements that have been called Crises" – and noting that these "convulsive movements" (mouvemens convulsifs) were "viewed [by d'Eslon] as evidence of the particular agent to whom they are attributed" – the "Society" Commissioners' Report, in its discussion of the "Crises", identified a number of common characteristics among the majority of those who displayed these "convulsive movements":

1. Only "the most sensitive subjects" – i.e., who were "sensitive" either as a consequence of "their constitution" or of "their illness" – displayed these "convulsive movements".
2. In the majority of cases, "convulsive movements" were only displayed after extended exposure to "magnetic procedures that involved direct physical contact" (procédés du Magnétisme animal, par contact immédiat) – there were, also, they noted, rare examples of "convulsive movements" due to the operator's action at a distance, where no direct physical contact had been involved.
3. Even the "weakest" of patients very rarely displayed "convulsive movements" if they were "magnetized separately".
4. Compared with individual treatments, group treatments – when given to the same subjects – always produced a greater number of "convulsive movements", of greater magnitude, in a greater number of patients, with less treatment, and in a shorter time.
5. Female patients were far more likely to display "convulsive movements" than male patients.
6. Rich female patients (de femmes riches) were far more likely to display "convulsive movements" than poor female patients (de femmes indigentes).
7. The majority of those who displayed "convulsive movements" only did so after an extended exposure to group treatment at the one treatment location.

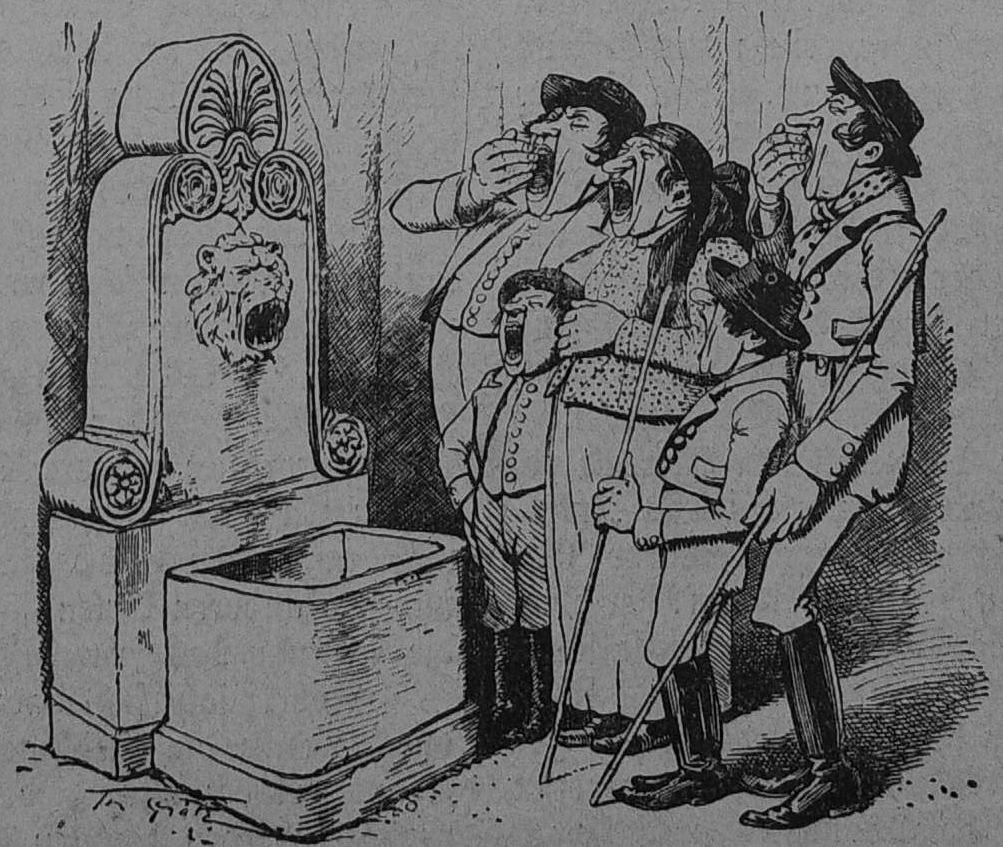
Yawning (due to behavioural contagion)

=== The Commissions' remarks on the perceived dangers of the "magnetic crises" ===
In the last section of its Report, the "Franklin" Commission, in addition to its remarks on the impact of the phenomena associated with a "crisis", made a number of significant observations on the perceived dangers of experiencing, or simply observing, a "crisis" in a number of domains, including:

a. the immediate and long-term physiological and psychological consequences of experiencing a "crisis" upon the "animal economy" of an already seriously ill person,
b.the immediate and long-term physiological and psychological consequences of experiencing a "crisis" upon the "animal economy" of an otherwise completely healthy person,
c.(given the considerable impact of the onlooker-consequences of issues such as behavioral contagion, Vicarious trauma, post-traumatic stress disorder. etc.), the immediate and long-term physiological and psychological consequences of observing another individual manifest a "crisis" upon the "animal economy" of an individual observer (regardless of whether the observer in question was healthy or not), and, on, a larger scale,
d.the detrimental effects of the "crises" on society as a whole.

Remarks on the dangers of 'Crises': in the final section of the (Franklin) Commission Report

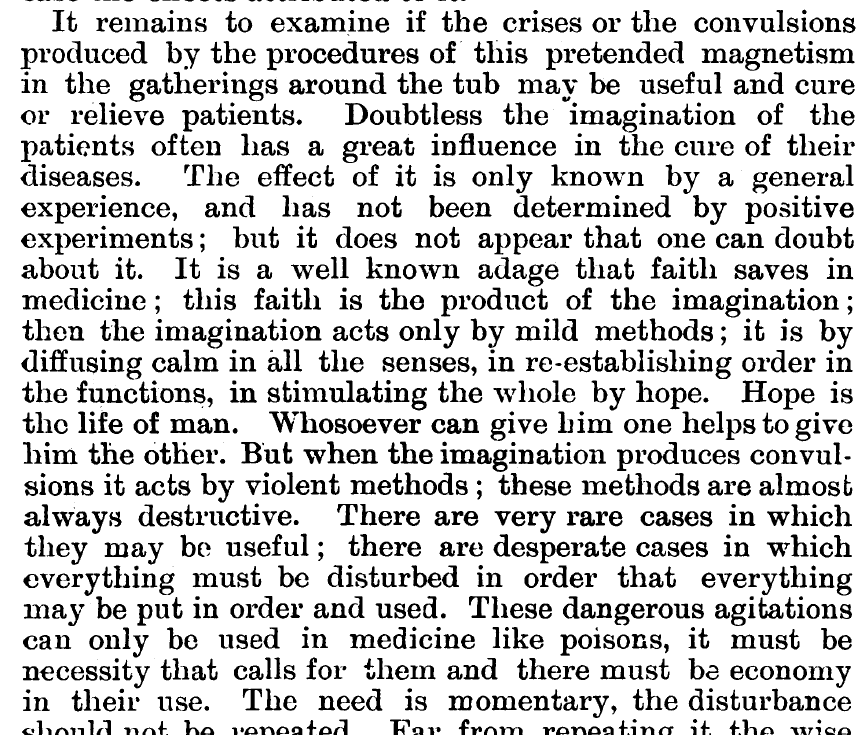
(first part)

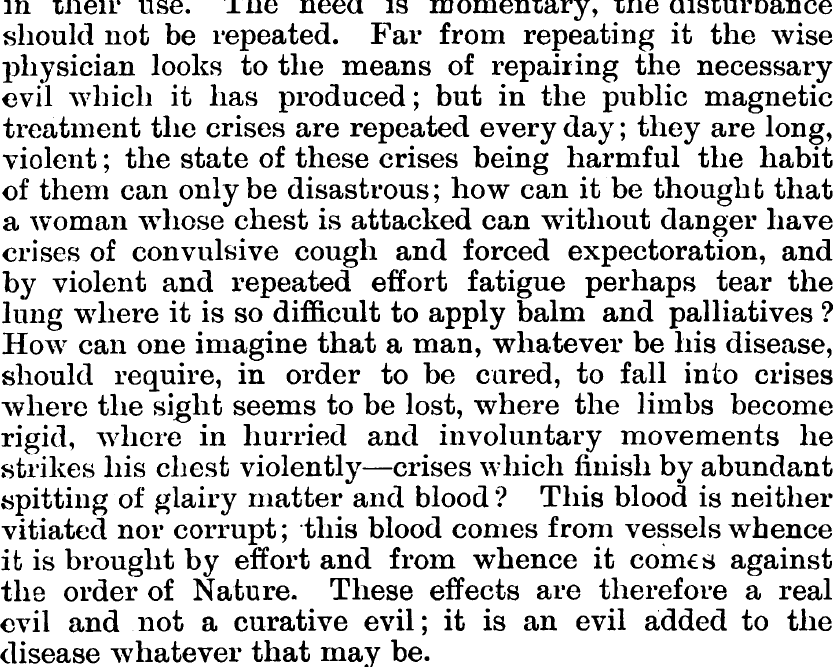
(second part)

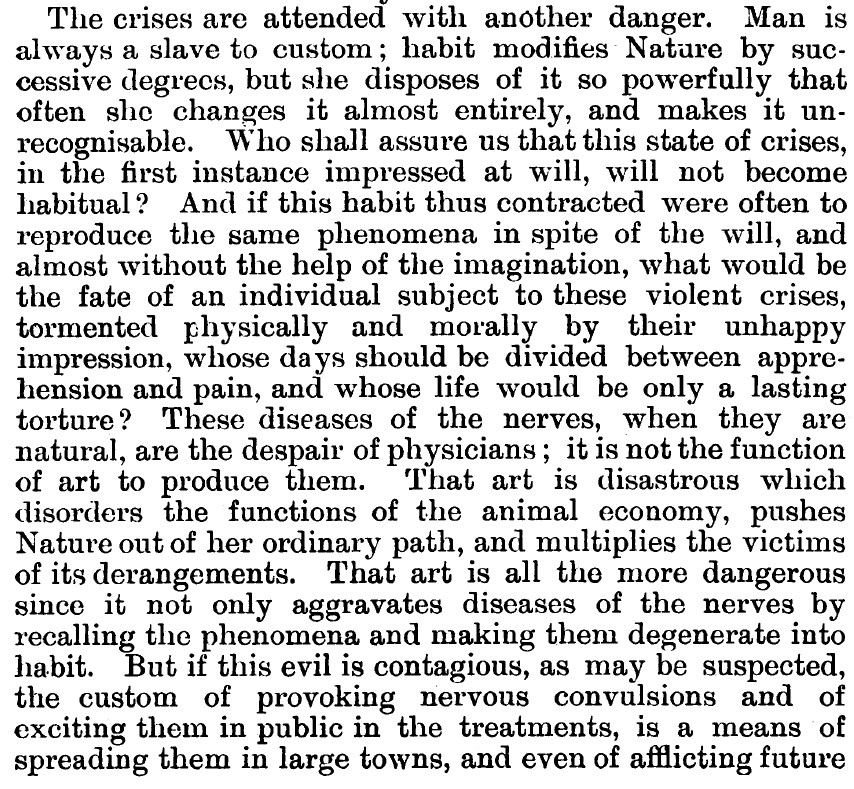
(third part)

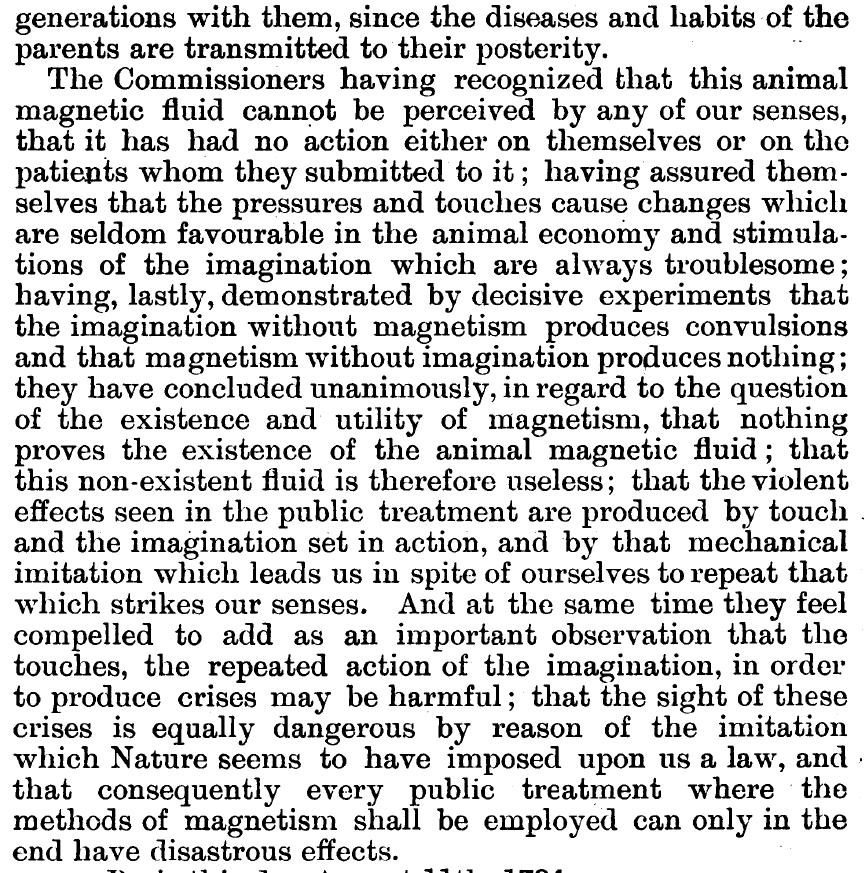
(fourth part)

=== Observations of the frequency of "crises" ===
One interesting aspect of a number of the pro-d'Eslon and pro-Mesmer responses to the Commissions' Reports, collectively, was that they provided figures on the level to which the author in question had observed individual patients manifest full-blown "magnetic crises" as a consequence of their exposure to an extended sequence of standard "magnetic" treatments.

- In his response to the Reports (d'Eslon, 1784b, pp. 21–22), d'Eslon complained that the Commissioners' emphasis on "convulsions" was not justified: among those who received group treatment during the commission's investigations (i.e., involving "50 to 60 individuals"), he wrote, there were never more than six or seven who displayed "convulsions" to any degree – and, further, of the more than 500 patients he had treated over the preceding three years, only 20 of those had manifested "convulsions" (and almost all of those had been suffering from "convulsions" before presenting for any treatment from d'Eslon). He also rejected the suggestions of any connection between the "convulsions" of epilepsy and those of the "crises", citing the cases of two of his patients, who were epileptic and "frequently had seizures at home", who never had a single "attack" during their treatment at his clinic (p. 23).
- Joseph Michel Antoine Servan, the one time Advocate-General to the Parlement of Grenoble, who reported (at Servan, 1784, p. 3) that, in "the Provinces" – where the various social classes were not kept apart around "the baquet", as they were in Paris – that, in relation to the concerns that the Commissioners expressed in relation to the "seizures" they had observed (and identified as one of the principal "dangers of magnetism"), he (Servan) had only observed "barely a few convulsions" ("not at all annoying in themselves") in only five or six individuals out of the fifty whose sequential treatments (and responses) he had observed in person.
- Jean-Baptiste Bonnefoy (1756–1789), a member of the Royal College of Surgeons at Lyon, and an associate of Mesmer, rejected the notion that Animal Magnetism was "the art of arousing convulsions" (l'art d'exciter des convulsions) (Bonnefoy, 1784, pp. 87–88); and, although he chose not to comment on d'Eslon's treatments, he stated that, from his own direct observation of Mesmer's treatment of more than 200 patients, he had only seen eight of them display "crises" – and, further, that only six of the more than 120 patients treated in his own clinic had displayed a "crisis".

== "Mesmerism" vs. "animal magnetism" ==
In order to understand the significance of the two Commissions' concentration on their examination of d'Eslons' claims for the existence of "animal magnetism" (rather than, that is, conducting an examination of the clinical efficacy of Mesmer's actual therapeutic practices) – and, in order to clarify certain ambiguities, and correct particular errors that persist in the literature – a number of basic facts need to be addressed (see, for example, Yeates, 2018, pp. 48–52), it is useful to isolate what later, subsequent to the publication of Wolfart's Mesmerismus (1814), became known as "Mesmerism" from other "animal magnetism" practices in general.

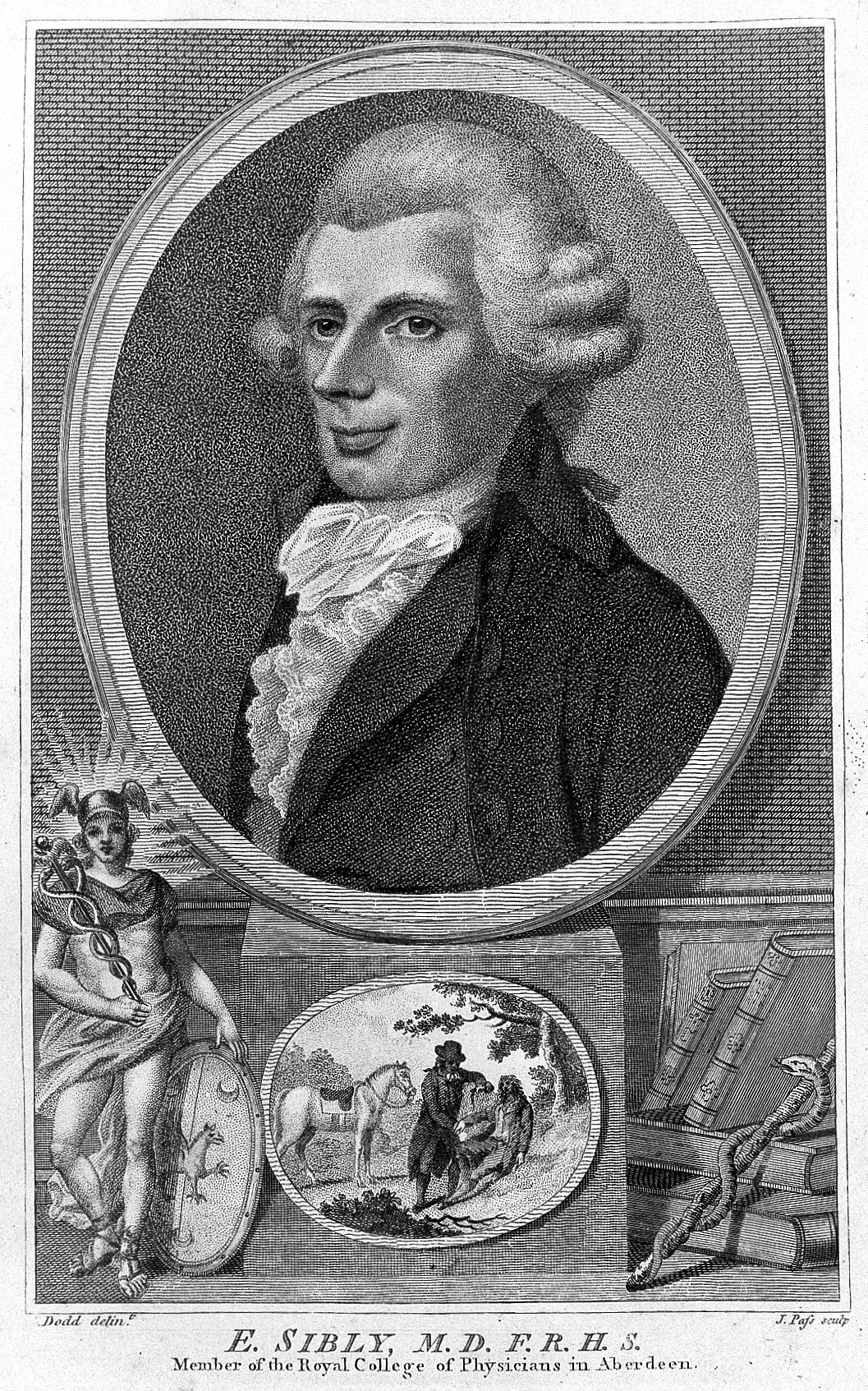
Ebenezer Sibly (1751 – c. 1799)

=== Similarities and differences ===
The materialist "mesmerists" and the metaphysical "animal magnetists" each held that all animate beings ("living" beings: humans, animals, plants, etc.), in virtue of being alive, possessed an invisible, natural "magnetic" or "gravitational force" – thus magnetismus animalis, "animal magnetism", or gravitas animalis, "animal gravity" – and the therapeutic interventions of each were directed at manipulating the ebb and flow of their subject's "energy field".

That constant flux and reflux of the vital principles and corporeal humours in man (without which both motion and life are stopped) produce those effects of sympathy and antipathy which become more natural and less miraculous; the atmospherical particle to each individual receives from the general fluid the proper attraction and repulsion. In the divers crossings of those individual atmospheres, some emanations are more attractive between two beings, and others more repulsive; so again, when one body possesses more fluid than another, it will repel; and that body which is less will make an effort to restore itself into equilibrium or sympathy with the other body.

— Ebenezer Sibly (1820)

Despite these fundamental similarities, there were many (even more fundamental) differences between the two.

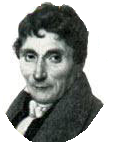
J.P.F. Deleuze

==== The "mesmerists" ====
In order to foster and promote orthopraxia, the materialist "mesmerists" used qualitative (rather than quantitative) constructs – centred on Mesmer's abstract and metaphorical overarching analogies with gravity, terrestrial magnetism, and hydraulics –– to explain the application of their techniques and to describe their therapeutic rationale.

When we call this principle magnetic fluid, vital fluid, we are using a figurative expression. We know that something emanates from the magnetizer: this something is not a solid, and we call it a fluid.

— Joseph-Philippe-François Deleuze (1814), p. 233

==== The "animal magnetists" ====
In contrast to the mesmerists, the metaphysical "magnetists" – who (mistakenly) reified (i.e., "substantivised") the magnetic/fluidic metaphors of Mesmer – firmly believed that they were channeling a substantial "fluidium" and were manipulating a particular, substantial "force".

What Thomas Brown(e), writing in the seventeenth century, deemed a vulgar error was the belief in sympathy as a unifying force working outside the human state, in this instance between two magnetically charged needles that of themselves are clearly incapable of having feelings, sensibilities, and affections. This alternative use of sympathy experienced a resurgence in the early 1780s, particularly in the field of animal magnetism, a practice that drew on the study of magnetism and electricity and fused these with the language of magic and the occult, blurring the boundaries between superstition and rational experimental philosophy.

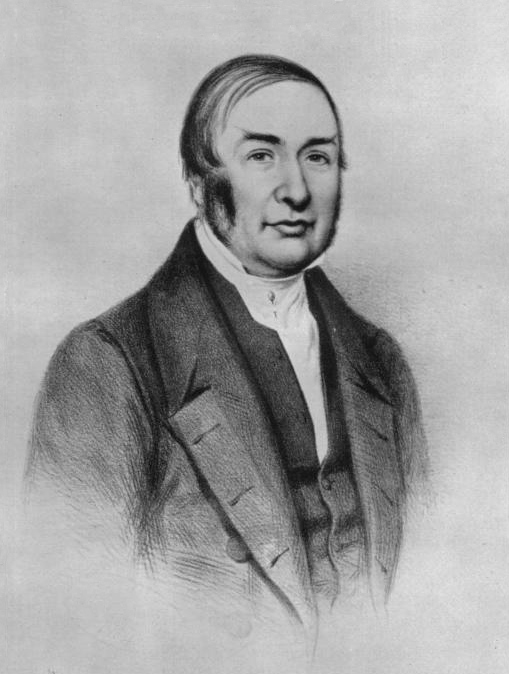
James Braid (1854)

==== The "higher" and "lower" phenomena of the magnetists ====
By the time of James Braid's (1841) Manchester encounter with the "magnetic demonstrator" Charles Lafontaine, those who were still committed to the existence of a substantial 'magnetic fluid", etc., maintained that the phenomena produced by their acts of "magnetization" were of two general classes – lower phenomena, and higher phenomena – the distinction being "that, while there might be natural explanations for 'lower' phenomena, 'higher' phenomena could only be explained in terms of a paranormal or metaphysical agency" (Yeates, 2018, p. 52).

== The investigations ==
=== The substantial existence of "animal magnetism" and "magnetic fluid" were investigated ===
Rather than being concerned with the applications, utility, and clinical efficacy of d'Eslon's "animal magnetism", the primary concern of each Commission was the significant, crucial, and exclusive question of whether or not d'Eslon's (supposed) "animal magnetic fluid" actually existed in some substantial physical way – for the simple reason that, as the two sets of Commissioners each noted in their independent reports, "Animal magnetism may well exist without being useful but it cannot be useful if it does not exist."

=== Mesmer's earlier refusal to have his "magnetic" interventions scrutinized ===
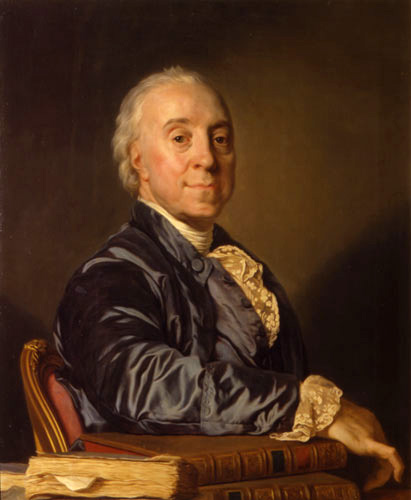
Joseph-Marie-François de Lassone, President of the Paris Faculty of Medicine

Already, in his earlier (18 September 1780) interaction with the Paris Faculty of Medicine, Mesmer had refused to have his therapeutic interventions on a set of entirely "new" patients directly scrutinized, claiming that his already-achieved "cures" were an objective matter of record. Mesmer justified his refusal as follows:

Here is what I said to M. de Lassonne; however bizarre [it may seem] at first sight it is nevertheless entirely serious and very much applicable to the question. When a thief is convicted of theft he is hanged: when a murderer is convicted of murder he is executed on the wheel. But to exact these terrible penalties the thief is not required to thieve again to prove that he is a thief, and the murderer is not required to murder a second time to prove that he is a murderer. One is content to establish by testimony and by material evidence that the theft or the murder was committed and then one hangs or executes on the wheel in good conscience.

Very well! It is the same with me. I ask, kindly, to be treated like a man to be executed on the wheel or hanged and that an effort should be made to establish that I have cured [patients] without asking me to perform new cures to prove that I am to be regarded as someone who cures.

=== Mesmer's "cures" were never investigated ===
In relation to the question of the agency/cause of Mesmer's supposed "cures" – and in the process of constructing the protocols for their investigations into d'Eslon's "animal magnetism" – both Commissions were well aware that "an effect's objective reality does not substantiate [any of the] proffered explanations [for its existence]" (Yeates, 2018, p. 61).

Notwithstanding Mesmer's earlier refusal to co-operate, and aside from the fact that the two Commissions were specifically charged with investigating d’Eslon's claims for the existence of "animal magnetism", there were two additional, significant reasons for not investigating the veracity of the "cures" attributed to Mesmer.

1. They had no persuasive evidence to suggest that the reports of Mesmer's "cured patients" were false.
2. The Commissioner's took the entirely reasonable and non-controversial step of accepting the existence of Mesmer's "cured patients" as a given.

In support of this decision, and noting that "observations over the centuries prove & Physicians themselves recognize, that Nature alone & without the help of medical treatment cures a great number of patients", the Commissioners agreed with the previously expressed observations of Mesmer – namely, that, even if significant improvements in his patients' presenting conditions had been objectively verified, the existence of those "cures", in and of themselves, would not have provided conclusive evidence of (metaphorical) "animal magnetism" – and, in support of their decision, the Commissioners cited Mesmer's own statements: that "nothing conclusively proves that the Physician or Medicine heals the sick", and because of that, it was (in Mesmer's own words), "a mistake to believe that this kind of proof is irrefutable".

Further, as Kihlstrom (2002) observed, even though the "Franklin Commission" had accepted that "Mesmer's cures were genuine", and that "he was able to succeed where conventional approaches had failed",

evidence of efficacy was not sufficient for academic approval. The scientific revolution had made physicians increasingly dissatisfied with purely empirical treatments, which were known to be effective but whose underlying mechanisms were unknown. In the emerging profession of scientific medicine, theories of treatment, like theories of disease, had to conform to what was known about anatomy and physiology. Then, as now, this scientific basis distinguished medicine from quackery and so was an important source of the physician's professional authority. While Mesmer wanted approval for his technique, the academy wanted verification of his theory.

— p. 414

=== The efficacy of "magnetic" treatments and the agency of (supposed) "magnetic" cures were not investigated ===
The two Reports also (separately, and in some detail) explained why the nature of the "effects" of (supposedly efficacious) treatments were not being examined, and why the agency of the (supposed verified) "cures" were not being investigated.

In noting that there were two different ways that "the action of magnetism on animate bodies" (l'action du Magnétisme sur les corps animés) could be observed:

1. from the long-term curative effects of "magnetic" treatments on disease, or
2. from the changes produced by its temporary effects on the individual's "animal economy" (l’économie animale),

and, despite d'Eslon's insistence that its investigations principally (and, almost, exclusively) concentrate on the "prolonged" effects of his (d'Eslon's) treatments on disease, the "Franklin Commission" firmly stated that its investigations would exclusively concentrate on the "momentary" effects of d'Eslon's procedures on the "animal economy".

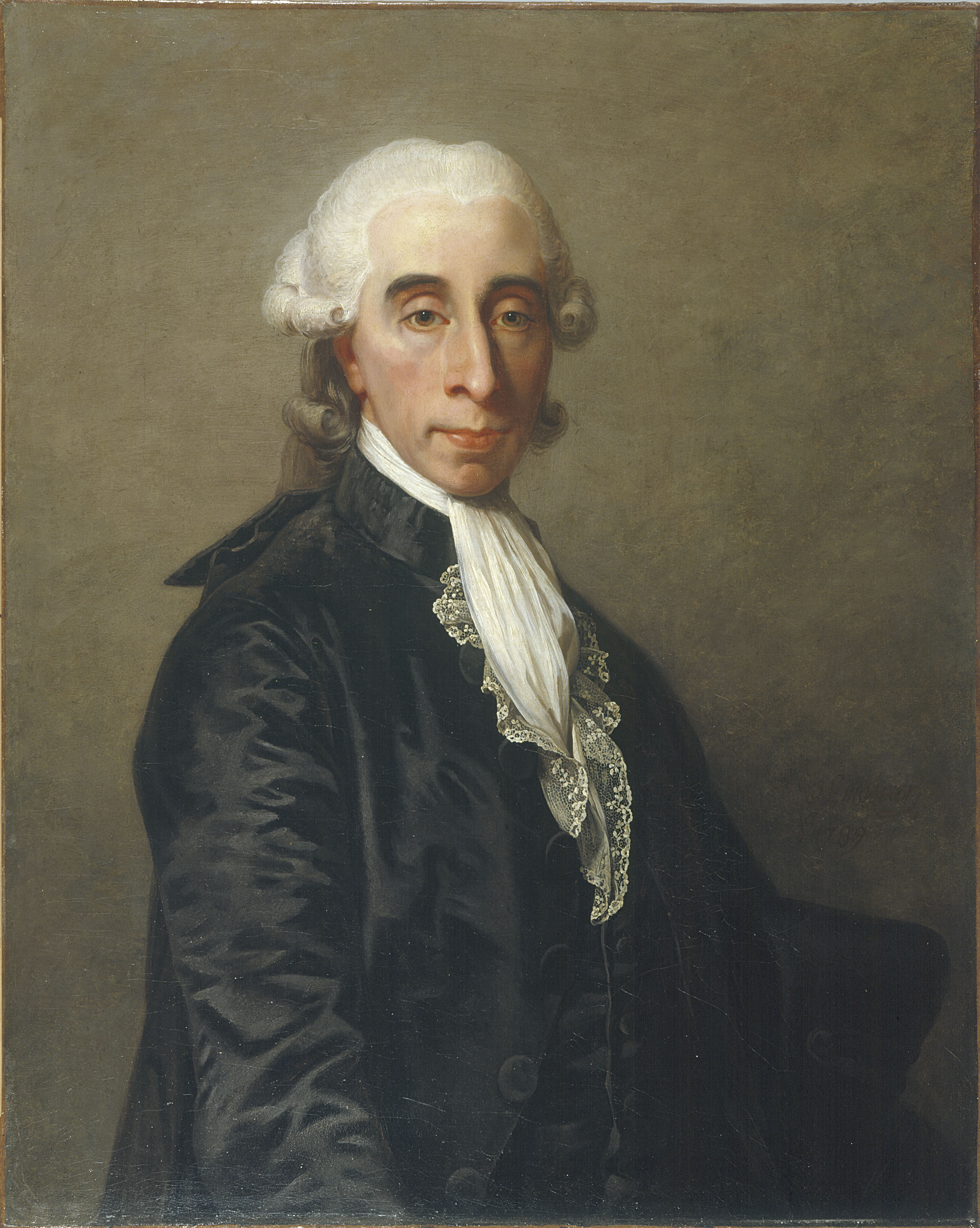
Jean Sylvain Bailly, 1789

=== Problems with objectively determining the precise agency of any supposed "cure" ===
The Commissioners (Bailly, 1784, p. 15) stressed that, because they had been specifically charged with determining whether (or not) d'Eslon's "magnetic fluid" actually existed in some substantial form, and because it was obvious that, in order to unequivocally settle the "uncertain" and "misleading" issue of whether there were real "cures" of "real" diseases from d'Eslon's therapeutic interventions, and whether any such "cures" were entirely the "effects" of d'Eslon's treatment, and nothing else – and even if the Commissioners were able "to strip from these therapeutic effects all of the illusions which might be involved with them" – any such determination would require an "infinity of cures", supported by the "experience of several centuries". And, further, given the specified goal of the commission, the significance of whatever its findings might be, and the obligation to produce its Report "promptly", the Commissioners considered that,

it was [their] duty ... to confine themselves to arguments purely physical, that is, to the momentaneous [sic] effects of the fluid upon the animal frame, excluding from these effects all the illusions which might mix with them, and assuring themselves that they could proceed from no other cause than the animal magnetism."

=== Problems with objectively determining the precise therapeutic action of any supposed "efficacious remedy" ===
In support of its decision, the "Franklin Commission" produced a cogent, extended argument, consistent with the medical knowledge of the day, that is equally relevant to similar investigations in the present day:

The majority of diseases have their seat in the interior part of our frame. The collective experience of a great number of centuries has made us acquainted with the symptoms, which indicate and discriminate them; the same experience has taught the method in which they are to be treated.
What is the object of the efforts of the physician in this method? It is not to oppose and to subdue nature, it is to assist her in her operations. Nature, says the father of the medical science [viz., Hippocrates], cures the diseased; but sometimes she encounters obstacles, which constrain her in her course, and uselessly consume her strength.
The physician is the minister of nature; an attentive observer, he studies the method in which she proceeds. If that method be firm, strong, regular and well directed, the physician looks on in silence, and [is careful of not] disturbing it by remedies which would at least be useless; if the method be [hindered], he facilitates it; if it be too slow or too rapid, he accelerates or retards it.
Sometimes, to accomplish his object, he confines himself to the regulation of the diet: sometimes he employs medicines.
The action of a medicine, introduced into the human body, is a new force, combined with the principal force by which our life is maintained: if the remedy follow the same route, which this force has already opened for the expulsion of diseases, it is useful, it is salutary [viz., conducive to health]; if it tend to open different routes, and to turn aside this interior action, it is pernicious.
In the mean time it must be confessed that this salutary or pernicious influence, real as it is, may frequently escape common observation.
The natural history of man presents us in this respect with very singular phenomena.
It may be there seen that regimens the most opposite, have not prevented the attainment of an advanced old age. We may there see men, attacked according to all appearance with the same disease, recovering in the pursuit of opposite regimens, and in the use of remedies totally different from each other; nature is in these instances sufficiently powerful to maintain the vital principle le fluide magnétique in spite of the improper regimen, and to triumph at once over [both] the distemper and the remedy.
If it ["the vital principle"] have this power of resisting the action of medicine, by a still stronger reason it must have the power of operating without medicine.
The experience of the efficacy of remedies is always therefore attended with some uncertainty; in the case of the magnetism the uncertainty has this addition, the uncertainty of its existence.
How then can we decide upon the action of an agent, whose existence is contested, from the treatment of diseases; when the effect of medicines is doubtful, whose existence is not at all problematical?

— Bailly (1784a, pp. 11–13).

=== Other highly significant but unassociated "causative" factors ===
In addition to reflecting the position of the "Franklin Commission" in these matters, the "Society Commission" also noted that there were other equally significant causative factors, concomitant with, but unassociated with, the treatment delivered, in relation to the circumstances of the patients themselves; namely,

the hope [of being cured] that they conceived, the exercise that they took every day, [and especially, whilst under the "magnetic" treatment] the suspension of the remedies they were previously using – the quantity of which is often so harmful in such cases – these are, in themselves, multiple and sufficient causes for the results that have been said to have been observed in similar circumstances

— Poissonnier, et al. (1784, p. 36)

=== Common misrepresentation of fact ===
The preceding facts expose the error – a classic example of equivocation due to lexical ambiguity – in the commonly expressed (in modern literature) and extremely misleading misrepresentation of affairs; namely, the (historically incorrect, and mistaken) implication that, rather than simply having, for convenience, accepted Mesmer's assertions at face value (and left it at that), both Commissions had objectively verified that:

1. prior to Mesmer's intervention, all of those who had been supposedly "cured" by Mesmer had, indeed, been suffering from a "real" medical disorder,
2. subsequent to Mesmer's intervention, all of those who had been supposedly "cured" by Mesmer had been genuinely "cured" of their "real" pre-intervention disorders; and
3. it was Mesmer himself that had "cured" those patients.

Consequently,

Although it is entirely correct to assert that both sets of Commissioners accepted [in a manner of speaking] that Mesmer's "cures" were, indeed, "cures", it is completely wrong to suggest that any of the Commissioners accepted that any of those "cured" individuals had been "cured" by Mesmer.

== Procedures ==
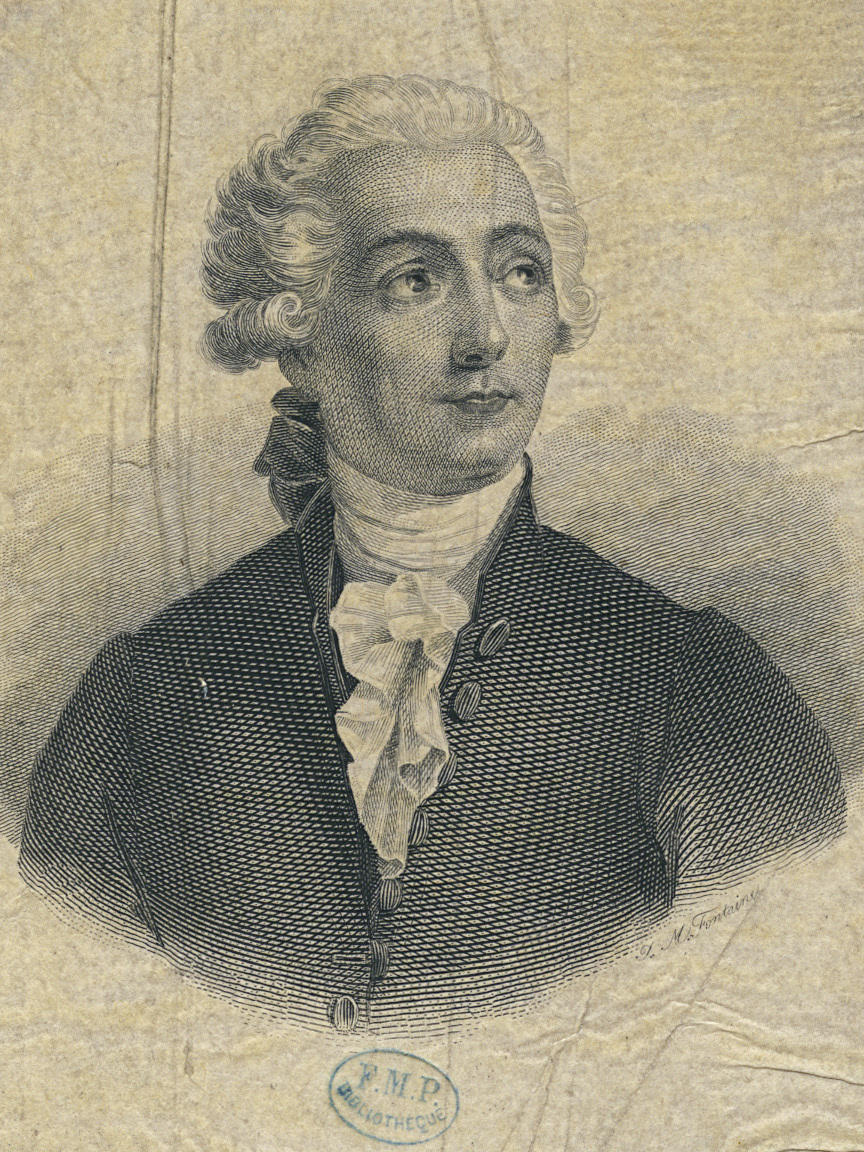
Antoine Lavoisier

The "Franklin Commission's" investigations were conducted at a number of different locations, including d'Eslon's clinic (which they visited once a week), Lavoisier's home, and the gardens of Franklin's Passy residence. The intricate structure and detailed procedures of the investigations were designed by Lavoisier; and great care was taken to eliminate what James Braid would later identify as "sources of fallacy".

In the process of examining d'Eslon's claims, the "Franklin Commissioners" not only tested the influence of a wide range of situations, circumstances, variables, but also, from time to time, individually presented themselves as experimental subjects, because, they reported, "they were very curious to experience through their own senses the reported effects of this agent".

When they visited d'Eslon's establishment, the Commissioners discovered that not only did d'Eslon's standard therapeutics involve (his version of) Mesmer's baquet, but also a musical (and, from time to time, vocal) accompaniment as a standard part of his treatment:

They saw in the centre of a large apartment a circular box, made of oak, and about a foot or a foot and an [sic] half deep, which is called the bucket [baquet]; the lid of this box is pierced with a number of holes, in which are inserted branches of iron, elbowed and moveable. The patients are arranged in ranks about this [baquet], and each has his branch of iron, which by means of the elbow may be applied immediately to the part affected; a cord passed round their bodies connects them one with the other: sometimes a second means of communication is introduced, by the insertion of the thumb of each patient between the forefinger and thumb of the patient next him; the thumb thus inserted is pressed by the person holding it; the impression received by the left hand of the patient, communicates through his right, and thus passes through the whole circle.
A piano forté is placed in one corner of the apartment, and different airs are played with various degrees of rapidity; vocal music is sometimes added to the instrumental.
The persons who superintend the process, have each of them an iron rod in his hand, from ten to twelve inches in length.

— Franklin Report (pp. 3–4)

And, moreover, given that the overarching metaphorical "principle" of Mesmer had been (inappropriately) reified ("substantified") by d'Eslon – and, also, given that "the existence of [d'Eslon's] alleged magnetic fluid was only based on the effects on the patients: in other words, the existence of a [substantial] physical entity [was being] inferred not from instrumental measurements and/or quantitative considerations, but by the psychophysical reaction of a living body" (Bersani, 2011, p. 61) – it is significant that

the commissioners in the progress of their examination discovered, by means of an electrometer and a needle of iron not touched with the loadstone, that the [baquet] contained no substance either electric or magnetical; and from the detail that M. Deslon [sic] has made to them respecting the interior construction of the [baquet], they cannot infer any physical agent, capable of contributing to the imputed effects of the magnetism.

— Franklin Report (p. 5)

The conduct and rationale of the commission's investigations is described in considerable detail in its Report.

In the process of their investigations they discovered that many non-"magnetised" subjects – wrongly believing themselves to have been "magnetised" – displayed a wide range of "magnetic" phenomena; and, by contrast, supposedly "magnetised" subjects, believing themselves to be non-"magnetised", displayed no "magnetic" phenomena at all. For instance, during the investigations conducted at Franklin's residence, d'Eslon "magnetized" one of five trees in Franklin's garden and, when a "sensitive" subject was brought to the trees, he fainted at the foot of one of the other four; and, on another occasion, during the investigations undertaken at Lavoisier's house, a normal cup of water swallowed by a subject (who believed the water to be "magnetized") immediately produced "magnetic" phenomena.

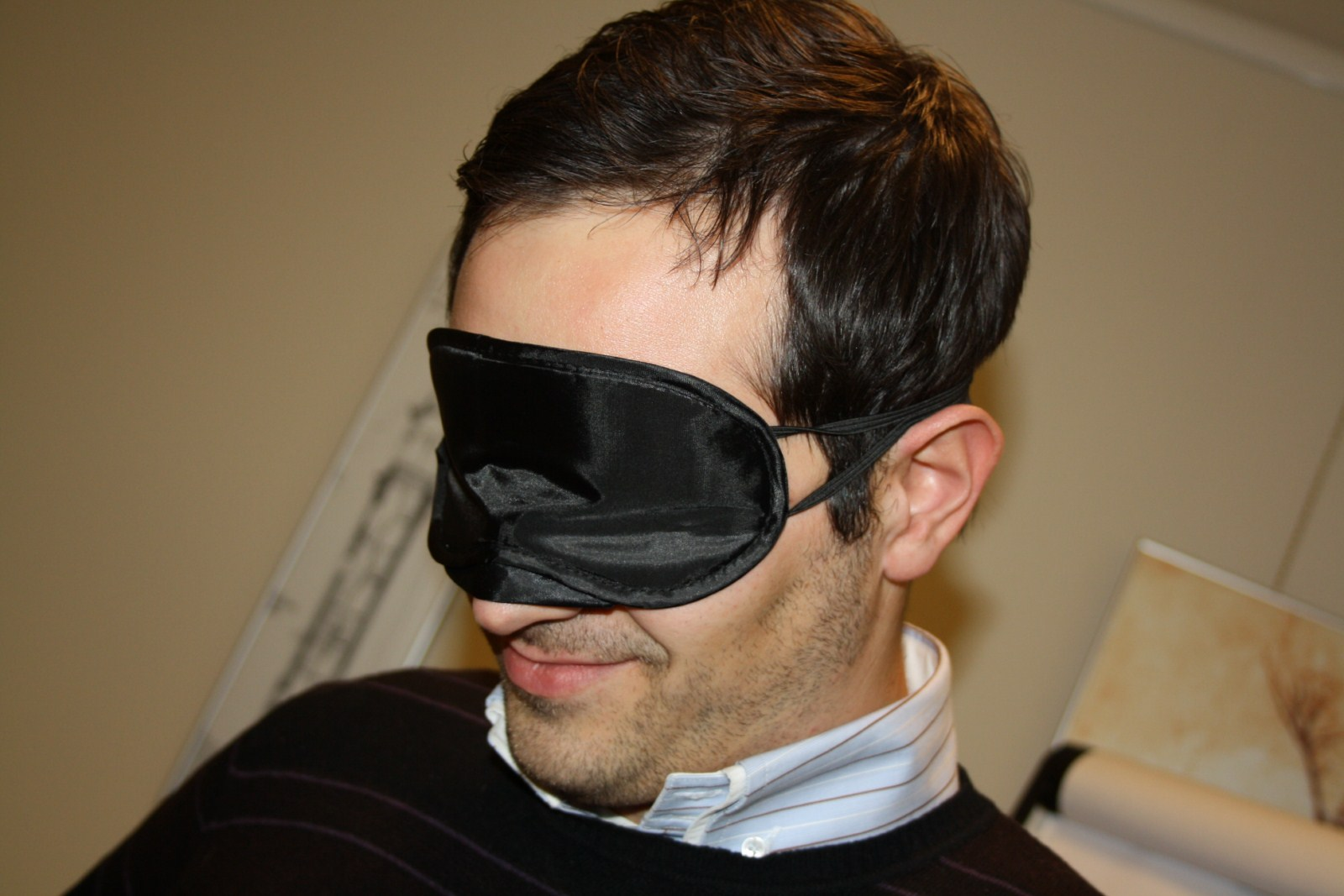
Man wearing a blindfold

The commission's procedures were, obviously, "[specifically designed] to give unequivocal answers to clearly defined hypotheses" (Donaldson, 2017, p. 166):

1. "they tested subjects from all classes of society in both group and one-to-one treatment settings";
2. "(given claims that "animal magnetism" affected 'the infirm' differently from 'the healthy'), they tested d’Eslon's procedures on genuine 'healthy', genuine 'infirm', and sham 'infirm' subjects";
3. "they observed and compared the responses of subjects when blindfolded and when not" – and, as Jensen, et al. (2016, pp. 13) observe, the Commissioner's use of blindfolding very strongly suggests that, rather than "[being] interested in proving [something that] they believed to be true", their investigations concentrated on "disproving, rather than proving, the efficacy of [d'Eslon's] treatments"; and
4. "they observed the responses of all varieties of subject to genuine and sham 'magnetisation'; and, as well, their responses to genuine and sham 'magnetised' locations, objects, apparatus, and equipment".

== The report(s) of the "Franklin Commission" ==
L'imagination fait tout, le Magnétisme est nul. ('Imagination is everything, magnetism nothing.')

— "Franklin Commission" Report

Rather than introducing a problem – the Franklin report ... provided a language for addressing one that already existed, forcefully articulating the suspicion that mechanical imagination could plague natural philosophers and religious "fanatics" alike.

— Ogden, 2012, p. 149

The "Franklin Commission's" investigations produced three separate reports.

=== The issue of d'Eslon vs. Mesmer ===
At the head of their principal report, the Commissioners directly summarize Mesmer's 27 Propositions, as expounded in Mesmer's 1779 Mémoire (1779, pp. 74–83). They also quote Mesmer's own "characterization" of his principle – namely, that "In the influence of the magnetism, Nature holds out to us a sovereign instrument for securing the health and lengthening the existence of mankind".

The Report's citation of Mesmer's 'characterization' of his principle

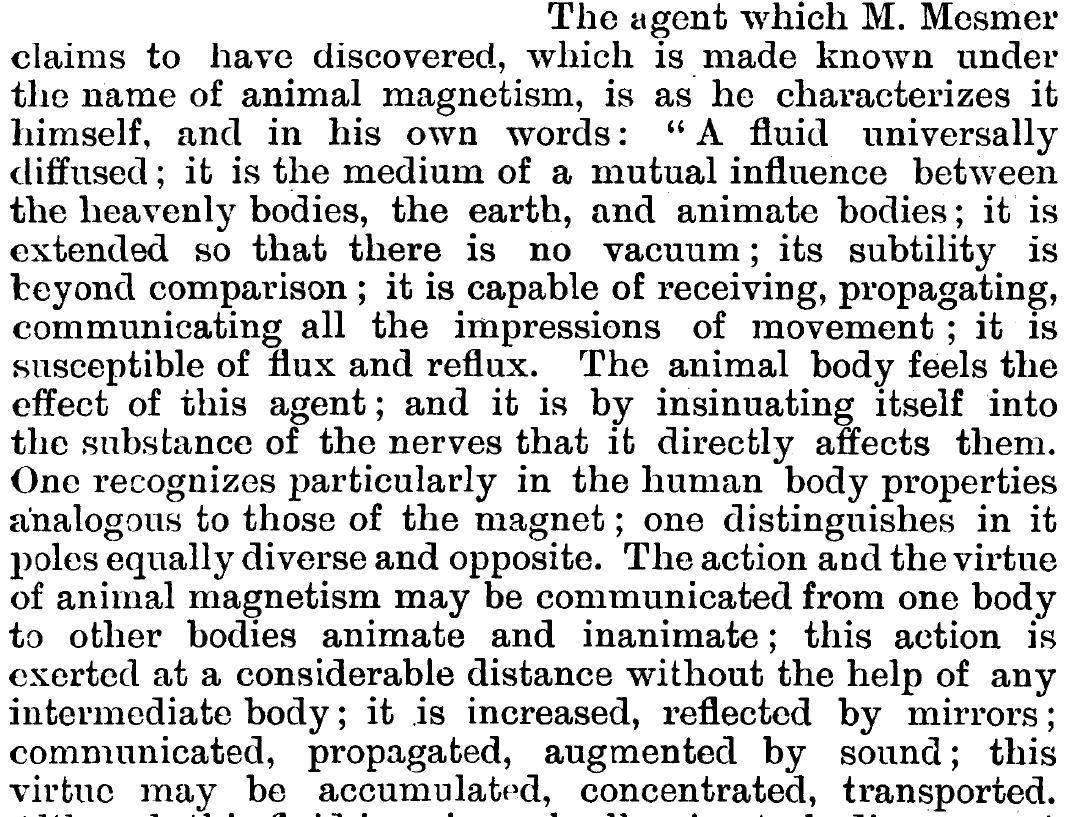
(first part)

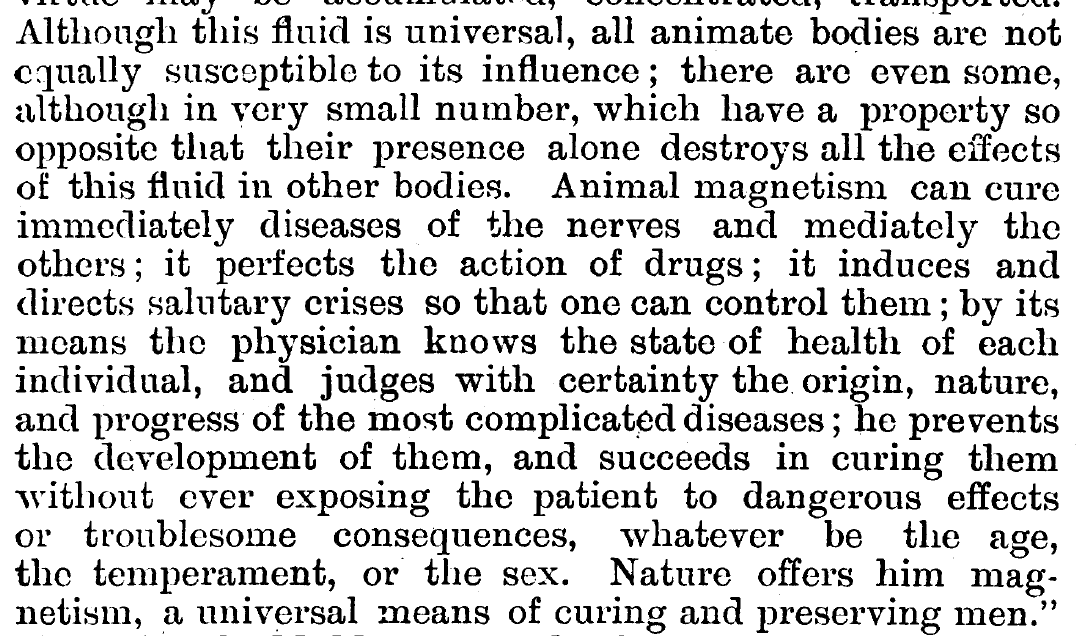
(second part)

They clearly state (p. 3) that, on the basis of a presentation given to the Commissioners, by d'Eslon (at his residence), on 9 May 1784 – at which d'Eslon had not only described his version of the "theories" of "animal magnetism", but also described and demonstrated his therapeutic procedures – the Commissioners were more than satisfied that d'Eslon's theories, principles, methods, and practices were consistent with those that Mesmer had made known through his publications; and, moreover, having acquired this thorough understanding of the "theory and practice of animal magnetism", the Commissioners then concentrated their efforts on determining the effects of its application – and, in order to do so, they visited d'Eslon's establishment on several occasions.

In an extended footnote to the last paragraph of their principal report, the Commissioners justified their investigative approach, and the appropriateness of their conclusions, in some detail.

The Report's final footnote

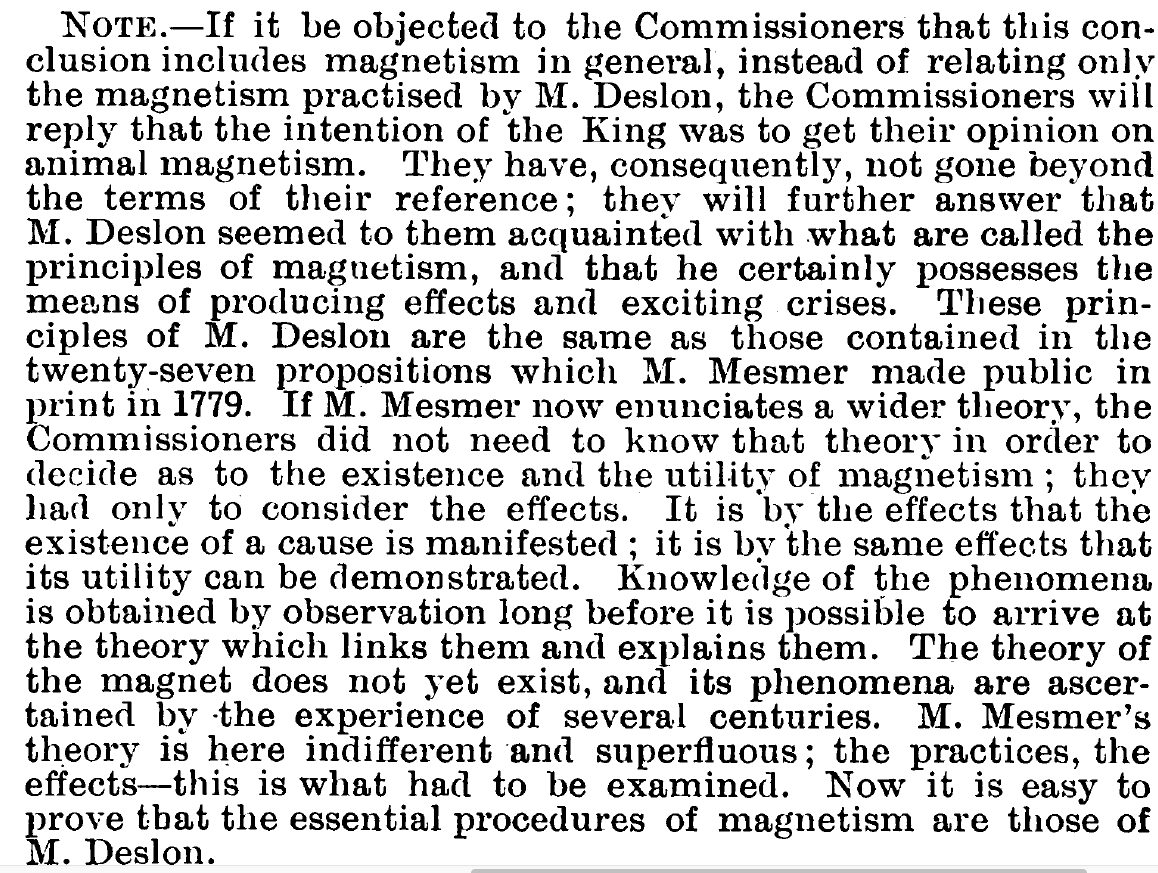
(first part)

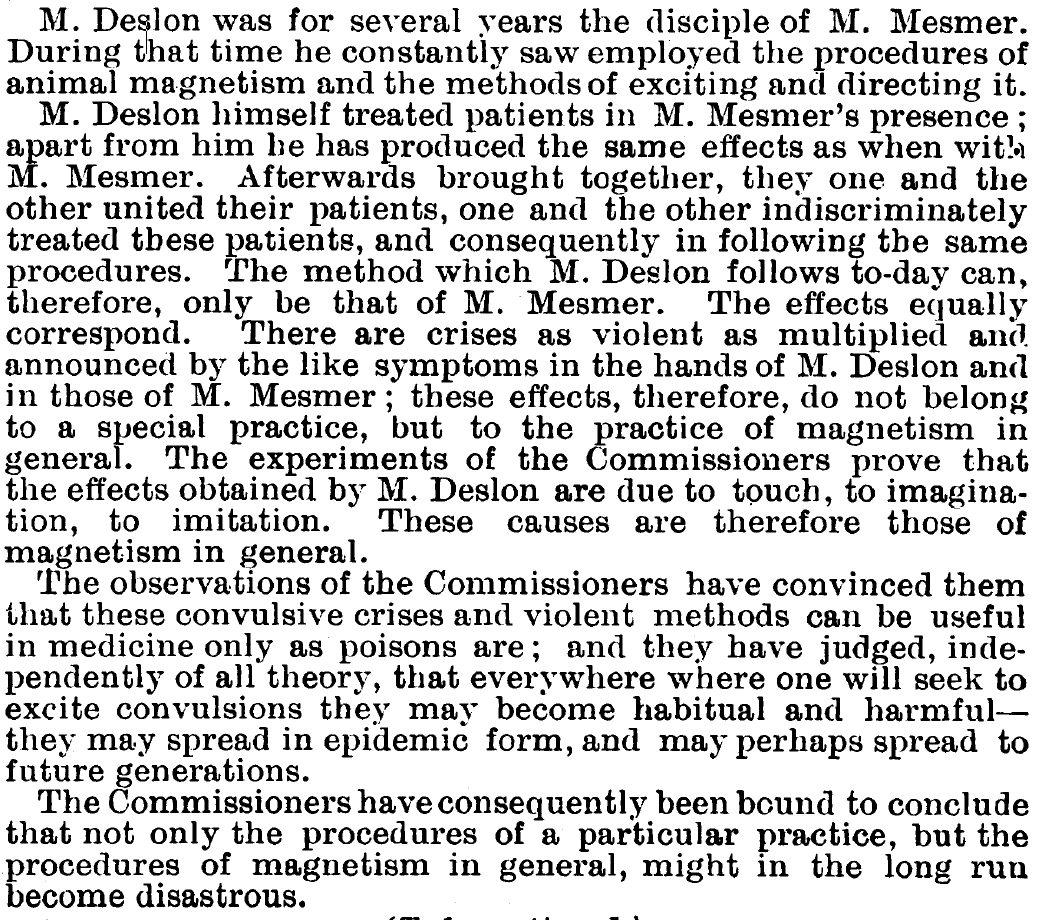
(second part)

=== The Commission's report ===
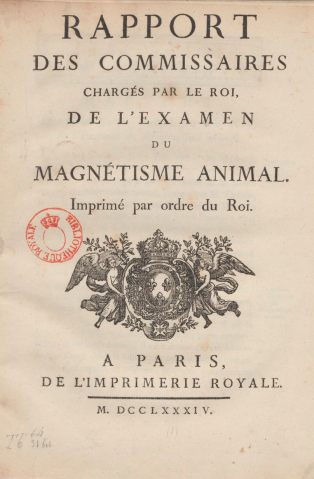
Official Report of the "Franklin Commission" (11 August 1784)

The first (66 page) report was presented to the King on 11 August 1784.

Knowing that their report would be published and that the task of convincing the public lay wholly in their hands, the authors produced an account that was both scientifically sound and accessible, making for compelling reading. Chronology was unimportant; few dates were specified. The rationale for every decision and the details of every experiment, however, were explained in terms that anyone could understand.

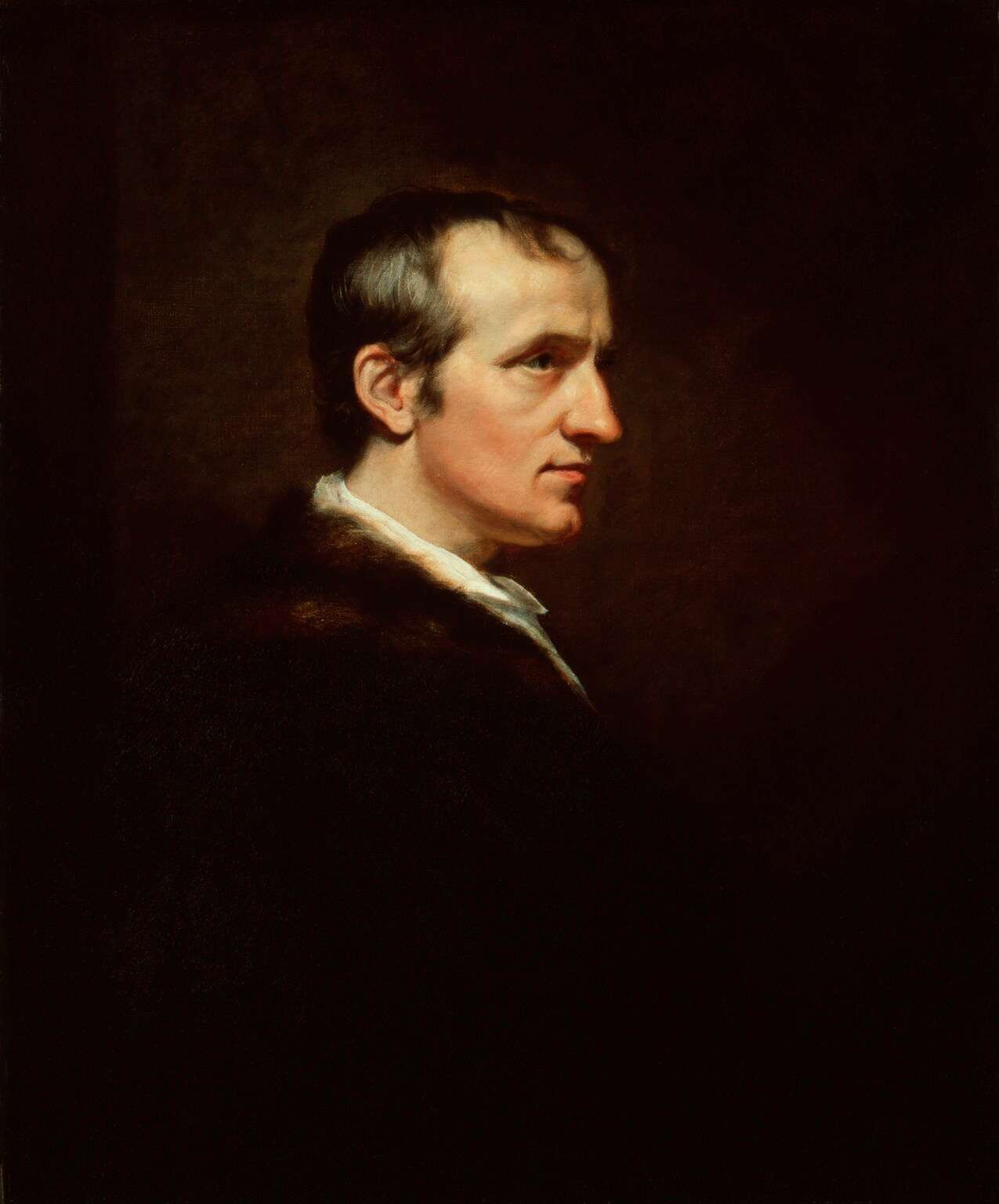
William Godwin, 1802

==== Immediate publication and dissemination ====
The report was immediately published by the government printer; and at least 20,000 copies were rapidly and very widely circulated throughout France and neighbouring countries. Within four months (16 December 1784), the London publishing house of Joseph Johnson was announcing the publication of a complete English version, translated by William Godwin (i.e., Godwin, 1785), and, in between February and July 1785, four different "periodical abridgements of the Franklin report, each printed multiple times in the Atlantic coast publications" were published in the United States (Ogden, 2012, p. 167); and, in 1837, Godwin's complete translation was published, in Philadelphia, as part of a collected work.

==== Touch, imagination, and imitation ====
Clearly "recogniz[ing] that publicly endorsing the curative effects of a technique that had no demonstrable basis in the science of the late 18th century could lead to a proliferation of medical quackery" (McConkey & Perry, 2002, p. 328) and, based on their own "experiments" and "observations", the Commissioners concluded that "the true causes of the effects attributed to this new agent known by the name of animal magnetism, [and] to this fluid which is said to circulate in the body and to communicate itself from one individual to another" were "touch, imagination, [and] imitation":

... having demonstrated by decisive experiments, that the imagination without the magnetism produces convulsions, and that the magnetism, without the imagination produces nothing; [the Commissioners] concluded with an [sic] unanimous voice respecting the existence and the utility of the magnetism, that the existence of the fluid is absolutely destitude of proof, that the fluid having no existence can consequently have no use, that the violent symptoms observed in the public process are to be ascribed to the compression, to the imagination called into action, and to that propensity to mechanical imitation, which leads us in spite of ourselves to the repetition of what strikes our senses.

— George Winter (1801)

==== No evidence to support d'Eslon's claims ====
The Commission found no evidence of any kind to support d'Eslon's claim for the existence of a "magnetic fluid":

The most reliable way to ascertain the existence of animal-magnetism fluid [l'existence du fluide magnétique animal] would be to make its presence tangible; but it did not take long for the Commissioners to recognize that this fluid escapes detection by all the senses. Unlike electricity, it is neither luminescent nor visible. Its action does not manifest itself visibly as does the attraction of a magnet; it is without taste or smell; it spreads noiselessly & envelops or penetrates you without your sense of touch warning you of its presence. Therefore, if it exists in us & around us, it does so in an absolutely undetectable manner.

— Bailly (1784a), p. 9.

=== The Commission's secret report ("for the King's eyes only") ===
A second (brief) report – which had been presented privately to the King on 11 August 1784, but not made public until 1800 (i.e., in the time of The Consulate period of French First Republic) – specifically addressed the perceived moral dangers occasioned by the physical practices of the animal magnetists:

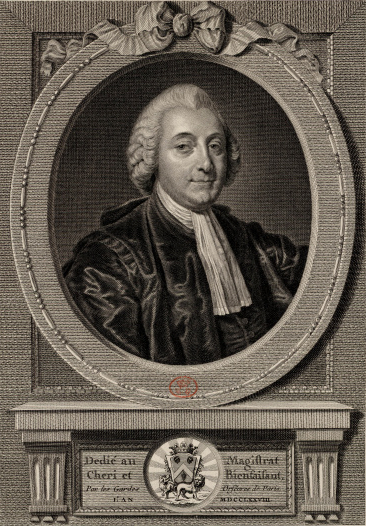
Jean-Charles-Pierre Lenoir, Lieutenant-General of Paris Police

The uniformly critical tone of this private document was in stark contrast to the scrupulously evenhanded voice of the official report; ... [and its] message was blunt: the practice of animal magnetism was a threat not only to health ... but also to morality, especially in the case of weak, virtuous women. ... [It] provided an explicit description of a certain kind of prolonged "convulsion" that resulted not from the alleged healing power of animal magnetism but rather from the close physical contact and mutual arousal of male magnetizers and female patients who did not fully understand what was being done to them. Deslon [sic] himself had admitted, under interrogation by [the Chief of Paris Police] Lenoir [who was present at a number of the Commission's investigations], how easy it would be to abuse a woman in such a state. Many women had been in treatment for years without being cured. Most of them were not ill to begin with, but had been drawn to the clinic for the amusement it provided, attending regularly as a relief from boredom. Around the tub, the ease with which symptoms spread from person to person was striking. The commissioners reiterated the health risks of inducing full-blown crises, a dangerous practice that any responsible physician would shun. They [also] implied [in this secret report] the possibility that magnetic seances were a deliberate fraud.

In concluding their report, they stress that they had not observed any "real cures" (guérisons réelles) from d'Eslon's treatments – which were, they noted, both "very long" and "unfruitful" – and, also, stress that, among d'Eslon's patients, those who had been under his treatment for 18 months to 2 years, without any benefit, ceased to present for any further treatment, having exhausted their patience (p. 152).

Finally, they noted (pp. 153–155) that, although charged with investigating d'Eslon's claims and d'Eslon's methods alone, they were satisfied that – offering essentially the same explanation as that in their for-public-consumption report (see "The Report's final footnote" in the Gallery above) – although they had not examined any of Mesmer's methods, etc., their findings applied equally to Mesmer and his methods, especially in relation to the attribution of all observed phenomena to "contact", "imagination", and/or "imitation" (p. 154).

=== The Commission's brief "courtesy report" to the Royal Academy of Sciences ===
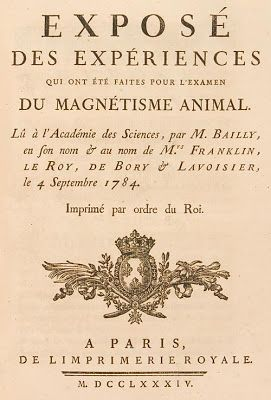
Brief Report to Royal Academy of Sciences (4 September 1784)

On 4 September 1784, Bailly presented a third, brief (15 page) courtesy report to the Royal Academy of Sciences (Bailly, 1784b) on behalf of himself, Franklin, Le Roy, de Bory, and Lavoisier (i.e., those Commissioners who were also Academy members), which provided their Academy colleagues with a brief account of the commission's proceedings, the rationale behind its investigations, and the results. Noting that all of their investigations were jointly conducted with the four members of the Paris Faculty, and that all nine shared the same "interest in [discovering] the truth", they stressed that all the findings of their combined efforts were unanimous (p. 2).

==== The importance of "the Sciences" ====
Further (p. 4), given that the understanding of the Sciences – "which [collectively] are increased by [establishing] the truth" (qui s'accroissent par les vérités) – is increased by "the suppression of error": i.e., given that "error" is always "a bad leaven that ferments and, in the long run, corrupts the mass into which it has been introduced". By contrast, however, in those cases wherein the "error" has been generated by "The Empire of Science", and has spread to "the multitude" – not only to divide and agitate minds, but also, in deceptively presenting a means of curing the sick, prevent them from seeking their cures elsewhere – "good Government has an interest in destroying it".

Moreover, anticipating the later remarks of Louis Brandeis ("Publicity is justly commended as a remedy for social and industrial diseases. Sunlight is said to be the best of disinfectants; electric light the best policeman": Brandeis, 1913, p. 10), the Commissioners (p. 4) remarked that, in terms of the "good Government" of an "Enlightened nation", "the distribution of light is a fine use of authority!" (C'est un bel emploi de l'autorité, que celui de distribuer la lumière!).

Not only did they endorse the Administration's decision to conduct an inquiry, but they also "embraced the honour [implicit in] its choice" of their own appointment as Commissioners.

==== Physics ====
Noting that the "greater" and "more extraordinary" a discovery, the more difficult it was to settle on suitable proof, they reported that, as physicists, they were unable to detect the presence of d'Eslon's supposed (substantial) "fluid" (p. 6). From this absence of "physical evidence", they were forced, instead, to "examine the affections of the spirit and the ideas of those who had been exposed to the action of 'Magnetism'"; and, from this, ceased to be "physicists", and became nothing more than "philosophers" (p. 8).

==== Chemistry ====
However, having been unable to operate as physicists, they had decided to follow the standard procedures of "chemists" – who, having "decomposed substances" and thereby discovered their "principles", assured themselves of the "exactness" of their findings by "recomposing" the same substances from their "reunited" constituents (p. 9).

==== Imagination ====
Given their inability to detect any (substantial) 'magnetism' – and, from their observations that the "effects" (that were attributed by d'Eslon to the supposed 'magnetism' and the supposed 'fluid') were only manifested when the subjects believed they were 'magnetised' (and were not manifested when they were unaware that they had been 'magnetised') – the Commissioners concluded that the "principle" involved was the subject's "imagination"; and, therefore, as a consequence of their investigations, they were well satisfied that they had been "fully successful" in experimentally proving that the observed "effects" had been produced "by the power of the imagination alone" (p. 9).

More than a century later, and entirely consistent with the Commissioners' findings, both Jean-Martin Charcot (of the "Hysteria School" of hypnosis at the Salpêtrière hospital), and his rival, Hippolyte Bernheim (of the "Suggestion School" of hypnosis at Nancy in Alsace-Lorraine), were united in their views that all of the supposed "miracle cures" at Lourdes were due to "auto-suggestion".

== The reports of the "Society Commission" ==
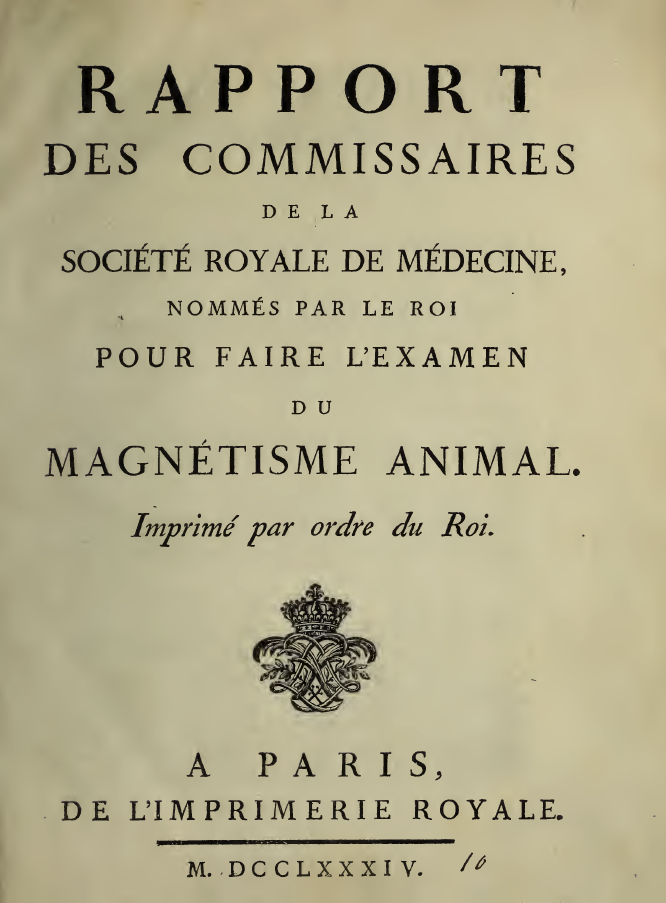
Official Report of the "Society Commission" (16 August 1784)

The "Society Commission's" investigations produced two separate reports.

=== The report of four of the five Commissioners ===
The first of the two reports, made by four of the five Commissioners (of 39 pages) – namely, Charles-Louis-François Andry, Claude-Antoine Caille, Pierre Jean Claude Mauduyt de La Varenne, and Pierre-Isaac Poissonnier – was presented to the King on 16 August 1784.

Given that the "Society Commissioners'" investigations were far less complex than those conducted by the "Franklin Commission" – and, also, given that the (smaller number of) experiments that they described "duplicate[d] similar ones in the ["Franklin Commission's"] Report" (Pattie, (1956), p. 156) – the report itself is briefer (39 pages), far less complex, and, therefore, far less influential. The Report was divided into two sections:

- Part One (pp. 2–21), discussing the theories of the practices known as "Animal Magnetism". It commences with d'Eslon's definition of "animal magnetism"; namely that it is "the action which one man exercises on another, either through immediate contact or at a certain distance by the mere pointing of a finger or any kind of conduct", and that "this action", according to d'Eslon, "is the effect of a fluid that is distributed throughout the universe"
- Part Two (pp. 22–37), discussing the procedures and practices of "Animal Magnetism", as well as addressing the issues of their therapeutic efficacy (or not), and those of whether (or not) the procedures/practices should be admitted to conventional medical practice ("doivent-ils être admis en Médecine!": p. 22).

The conclusions drawn (pp. 37–39) were, in brief, that they had found no evidence of d'Eslon's "magnetic fluid", that there were "no grounds for any belief in animal magnetism", that "the effects attributed to it are due to known causes", including not only the influence of "contact", "imagination", and/or "imitation", but also the influence of "the environment of the treatment room with its closed windows, fetid air, dim light, and the sight of other patients [and their responses to their treatments]" – and, as Laurence notes, that "the [observed] results ... were not due to animal magnetism but to the patients‘ rest, exercise, abstinence from medication, and hopes for a cure!" (2002, p,316) – and that, from this, there was no reason for "the procedures to which the name 'animal magnetism' has been given [to be] introduced into the practice of medicine" (Pattie, 1994, p. 157).

==== The later representations of Burdin and Dubois ====
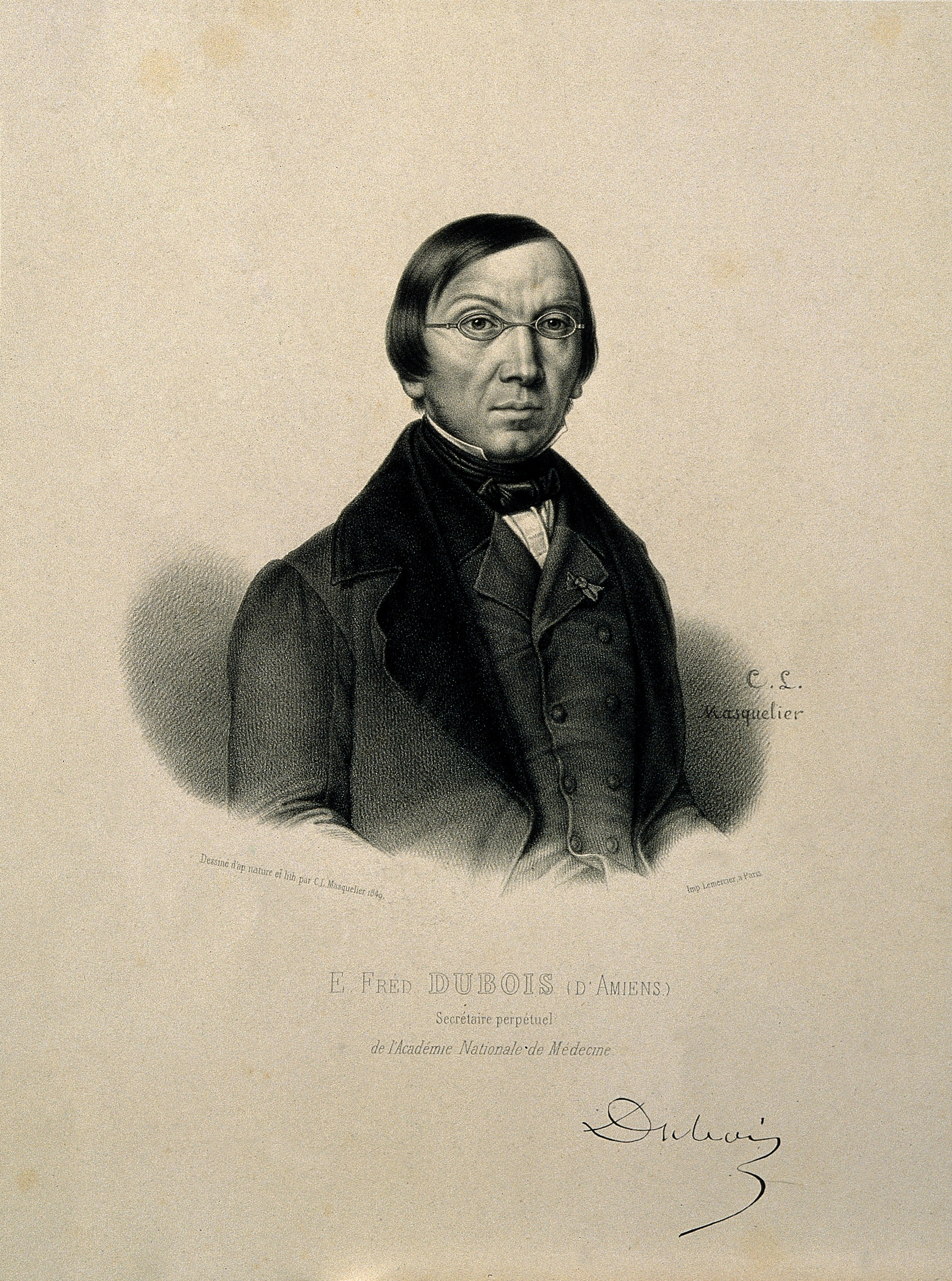
Frédéric Dubois (1849)

Although the "Society Commission" did not directly investigate the clinical efficacy of d'Eslon's therapeutic interventions, and did not examine the circumstances of any earlier (i.e., pre-Commission) "cures" claimed by d"Eslon, two members of the Royal Academy of Medicine, Charles Burdin Jeune (1778–1856) and Frédéric Dubois d'Amiens (1797–1873), writing in 1841, drew attention to the fact that, in the process of their (1784) investigations, the "Society Commissioners" identified three categories of patient treated by d'Eslon – (a) those with an "obvious ailment" with "a known cause", (b) those with "mild" and "vague" ailments with no known cause, and, finally, (c) the melancholics (les mélancoliques) – and, significantly, having followed the collective progress of d'Eslon's patients over a period of four months, the Commissioners found no evidence of any kind that any members of the '(a) group' (many of whom had been receiving d'Eslon's treatment "for more than a year") had been "cured" (guéris), or, even, "noticeably relieved" (notablement soulagés) of their ailment.

=== De Jussieu's "dissenting" report ===
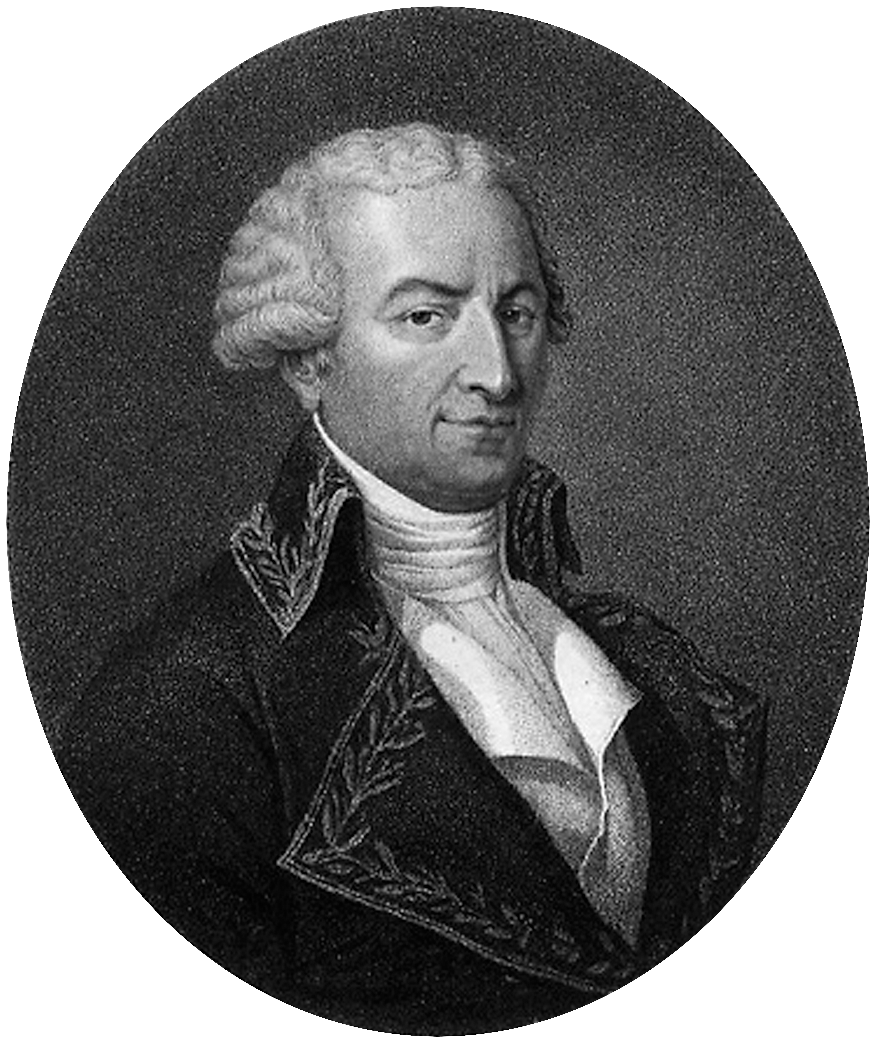
Antoine Laurent de Jussieu (1748–1836)

The second of the two reports, made by de Jussieu alone (of 51 pages) was independently published on 17 September 1784.

In de Jussieu's dissenting view, "[and] despite d'Eslon's 'magnetic fluid' claims having been debunked [he felt that] there were sufficient 'effects' (such as, for instance, 'post-magnetic amnesia') unattributable to 'imagination' that still required further investigation into their exact nature; and, therefore, he argued, the continued use of animal magnetism was justified" (Yeates, 2018, p. 50).

Noting that, in his view, "a longer use of this agent will make its real action and degree of usefulness to be better understood", de Jussieu concluded:

The theory of magnetism cannot be admitted so long as it will not be developed and supported by solid facts. The experiments instituted to ascertain the existence of the magnetic fluid prove only that man produces on his like a sensible action by friction, by contact, and more rarely by simple approximation at some distance. This action, attributed to a universal fluid not demonstrated, certainly appertains to animal heat [la chaleur animale] existing in bodies, which constantly emanates from them, is carried to a considerable distance, and is capable of passing from one body into another. Animal heat is developed, increased, or diminished in a body by moral as well as by physical causes. Judged by its effects, it participates in the property of tonic remedies, and like them produces salutary or injurious effects according to the quantity communicated, and according to the circumstances in which it is employed.

— de Jussieu, 1784, pp. 50–51

== Responses to the Commissions' conclusions ==
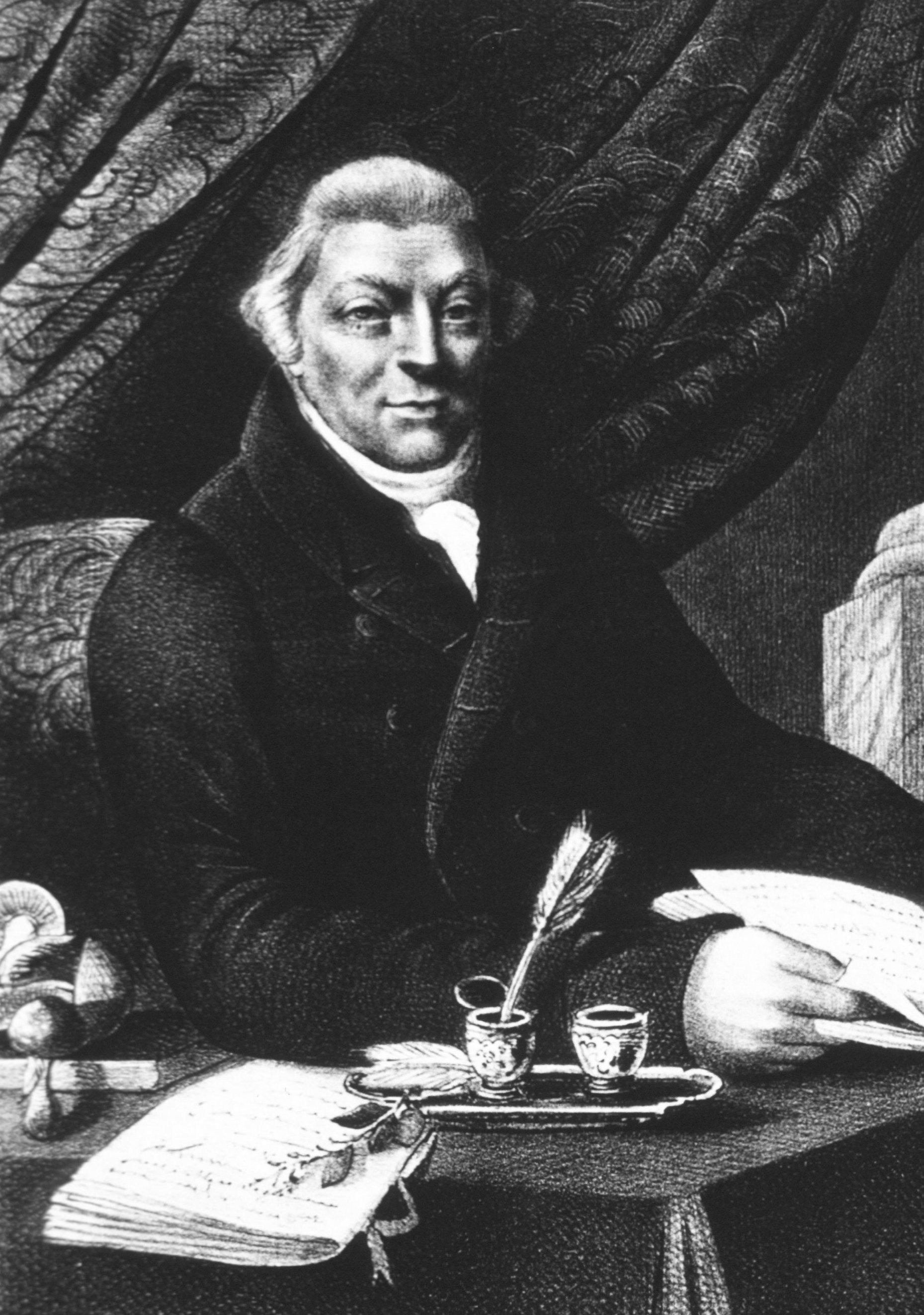
Jean-Jacques Paulet

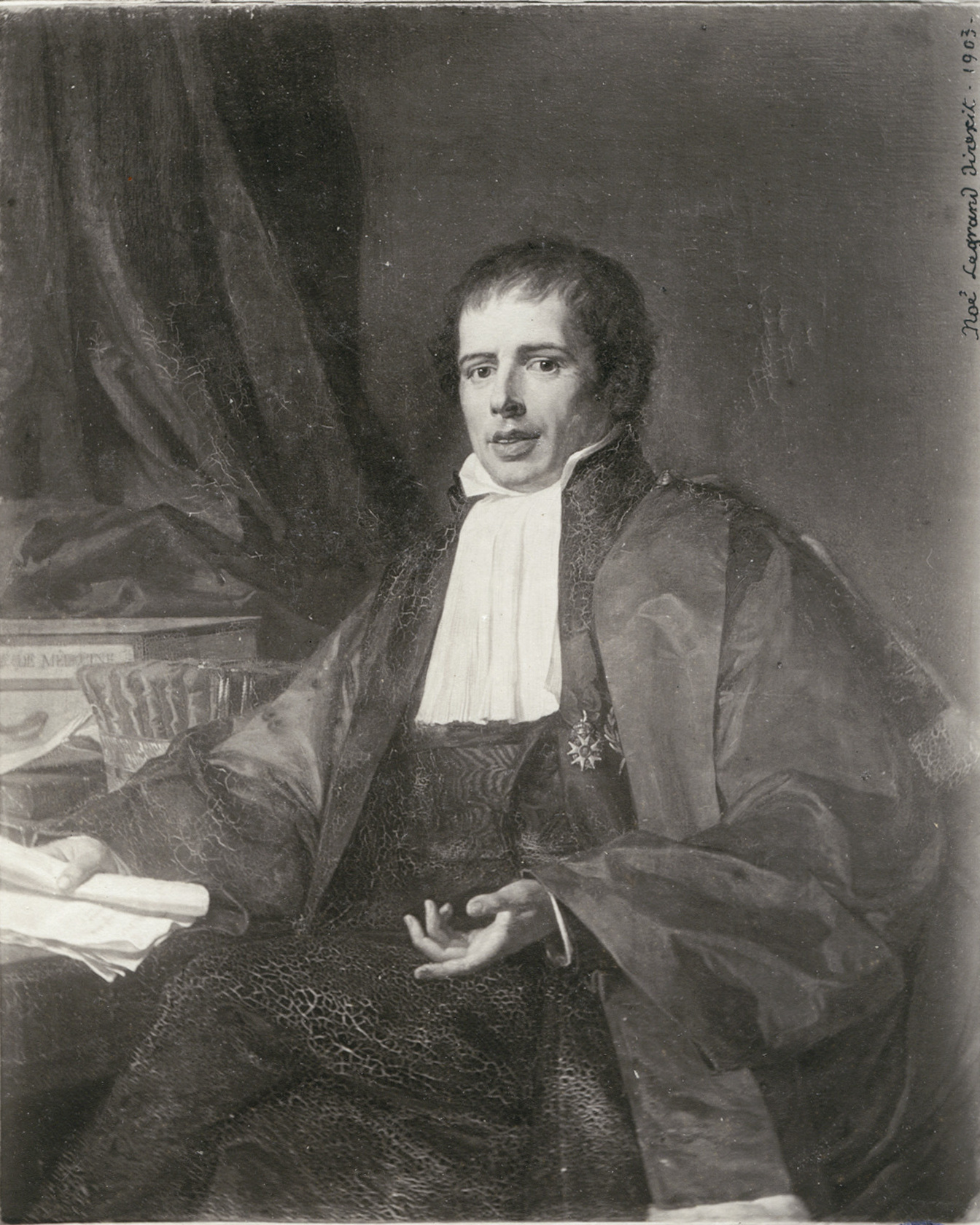
Michel-Augustin Thouret

A measure of the influence of ... the claims investigated, the methods employed, and the conclusions reached ... [by] the Franklin Report is seen in the changing fortunes of Mesmer during the months of 1784. Prior to the submission of the Report, Mesmer had been the toast of Paris, dealing with many wealthy patrons ... Following publication of the Report, Mesmer was a focus of public scorn and ridicule ...

— McConkey & Barnier (1991), pp. 77–78

The release of the reports generated a proliferation of publications, many of which were simply addressing issues relating to either "mesmerism" or "animal magnetism" in general – such as, for instance, those of Jean-Jacques Paulet (1784), and Michel-Augustin Thouret (1784) – while others, such as those of Charles Joseph Devillers, himself a member of the Royal Academy of Sciences – who (at Devillers, 1784, pp. 165–166) compared the "cures" of Mesmer, with those supposed to have been effected at the tomb of François de Pâris in Saint-Médard, some forty years earlier – and Jacques Cambry (1784) – who provided details of beliefs similar to those of Mesmer previously held by the ancient Greeks, Persians, and Romans – strongly supported the findings of the Commissions.

=== Response of the Paris Faculty of Medicine ===
Immediately following the release of the reports of the two Commissions, the Paris Faculty of Medicine "pressure[d] its own members to renounce animal magnetism" (Crabtree, 1993, p. 32).

The Faculty identified some thirty of its docteurs-régent, including François Louis Thomas d'Onglée and Charles-Louis Varnier, who "openly favored animal magnetism or were suspected of so doing". According to the contemporary account of Thomas d'Onglée (1785, passim), the thirty "magnetic physicians" were subjected to "abuse" and were presented with a declaration, of which it was demanded that they sign. Both Thomas d'Onglée and Varnier, among others, refused to sign the declaration (and were, thereby, immediately expelled). The declaration in question read:

No Doctor may declare himself a partisan of animal magnetism, through writings or through practice, under penalty of being removed from the role of docteurs-régents.

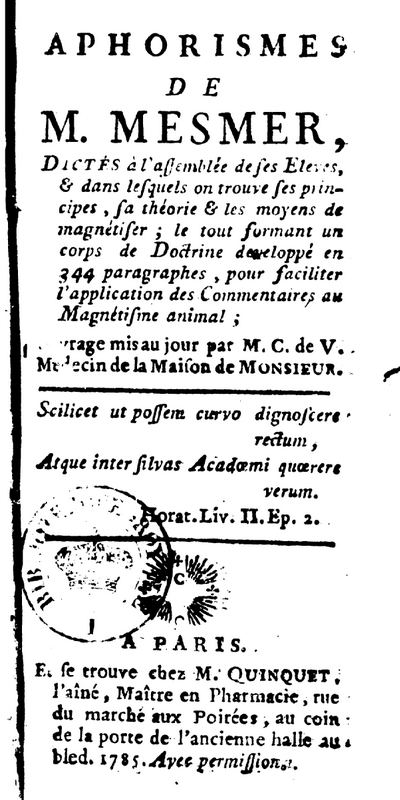
Caullet de Veaumorel's Aphorismes of M. Mesmer

=== D'Eslon's response ===
D'Eslon immediately published an attack on the commission's reports, in which he criticized their failure to investigate the longer-term effects of his treatments, and their refusal to accept his (alleged) "cures" as proof of the existence of "animal magnetism", as well as noting that, "the commissioners' recommendation that the practice of magnetism should be prohibited ... would hardly be possible [to implement]", because, apart from those within the medical profession who had been trained by himself and by Mesmer, "a large number of other people had, as a result of their own study, begun to practice it" (Pattie, 1994, p. 171).

In addition to his specific criticisms of the reports of the two Royal Commissions – and to emphasize the significance of the Royal Commissions' refusal to investigate either the alleged efficacy of his treatment procedures (i.e., investigate d'Eslon's actual practices, rather than just the veracity (or not) of his theoretical claims, and that alone), and the alleged curative effects of his standard, extended regimens of "magnetic" treatment – d'Eslon published an 80-page supplementary volume (i.e., d'Eslon, 1784c), that provided the case histories of 115 individuals (the majority of whom were identified by name), that had been successfully treated by d'Eslon's procedures for a very wide range of diseases.

On 10 December 1784, and in support of d'Eslon, one of his associates (and a former student), Louis Caullet de Veaumorel, published a set of Mesmer's class notes that de Veaumorel had acquired from one of Mesmer's "disloyal" students.

Caullet de Veaumorel's work, which made no mention of d'Eslon's theories, teachings, or clinical procedures, went into three editions. Caullet de Veaumorel stressed that although, as a "disciple of d'Eslon", he was bound by his "word of honour" not to reveal any of d'Eslon's teachings, he was entirely free to publish Mesmer's material – and, in doing so, he had not altered one word of Mesmer's "maxims" – and, moreover, he was certain that, given Mesmer's dissemination of his ideas through his already published works, Mesmer would not be "offended" by the publication of his aphorisms.

Although Mesmer protested to the Journal de Paris that Caullet de Veaumore's Aphorismes "were a distorted account of his lectures", according to Pattie (1994, p. 213), "they [were] accurate" and, moreover, "they agree[d] with later writings of Mesmer".

=== Mesmer's response ===
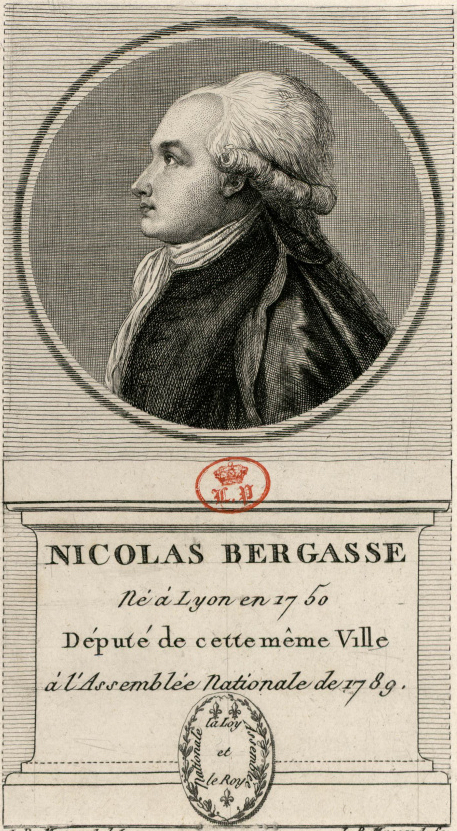
Nicolas Bergasse

In his own responses to the Commissions' Reports, Mesmer stressed that – simply because he had not been involved in any of their investigations – the Commissioners' conclusions had nothing whatsoever to do with his (metaphorical) "animal magnetism"; and, because their conclusions only applied to d'Eslon's theories and practices, any responses to those conclusions were entirely the concern of d'Eslon alone.

Further, and immediately following the publication of the Reports of the two Commissions, both Nicolas Bergasse (1750–1832) (Bergasse, 1784) and Antoine Esmonin, Marquis de Dampierre (Esmonin, 1784) wrote strong criticisms of the Commissions' orientation, investigations, and findings; and, separately, a number of Mesmer's followers published a composite volume (i.e., Mesmer, et al., 1784) of 478 pages, which included a number of previously published items written by Mesmer, as well as a number of shorter and up-to-date contributions from a range of various authors describing their continued success with animal magnetism.

== The "Franklin Commission's" investigations considered to be a "classic" example of a controlled trial ==
[T]his is the first scientific investigation that we know of into what would today be considered a paranormal or pseudoscientific claim. ... [And it is clear that] the control of intervening variables and the testing of specific claims, without resort to unnecessary hypothesizing about what is behind the "power", is the lesson modern skeptics should take from this historical masterpiece.

— Michael Shermer (1996, emphasis added).

The detailed studies of Stephen Jay Gould (in 1989) and John Kihlstrom (in 2002) drew disciplinary attention to nature and the form of the commission's extended examination as a "watershed moment" in the history of science – subsequent to which things were never the same.

If the commission was not the first, it was, at least, one of the very earliest examples of a controlled trial; and, in particular, one that included the use of physical (rather than metaphorical) blindfolds – which were used from time to time on both the experimenters and their experimental subjects – as well as testing both "sham" and "real" procedures on both "sham" and "real" patients.

Inspired by Gould and Kihlstrom's studies, a number of other scholars in other scientific domains – such as, for example, Shermer (1996), Kaptchuk (1998), Green (2002), Best, Neuhauser, and Slavin (2003), Herr (2005), Lanska & Lanska (2007), Kaptchuk, Kerr & Zanger (2009), Davies Wilson (2014), Jensen, Janik & Waclawik (2016), Zabell (2016), Donaldson (2017), and Rosen et al. (2019) – have also identified the commission's examination as a previously unrecognized "classic" example of a controlled trial.

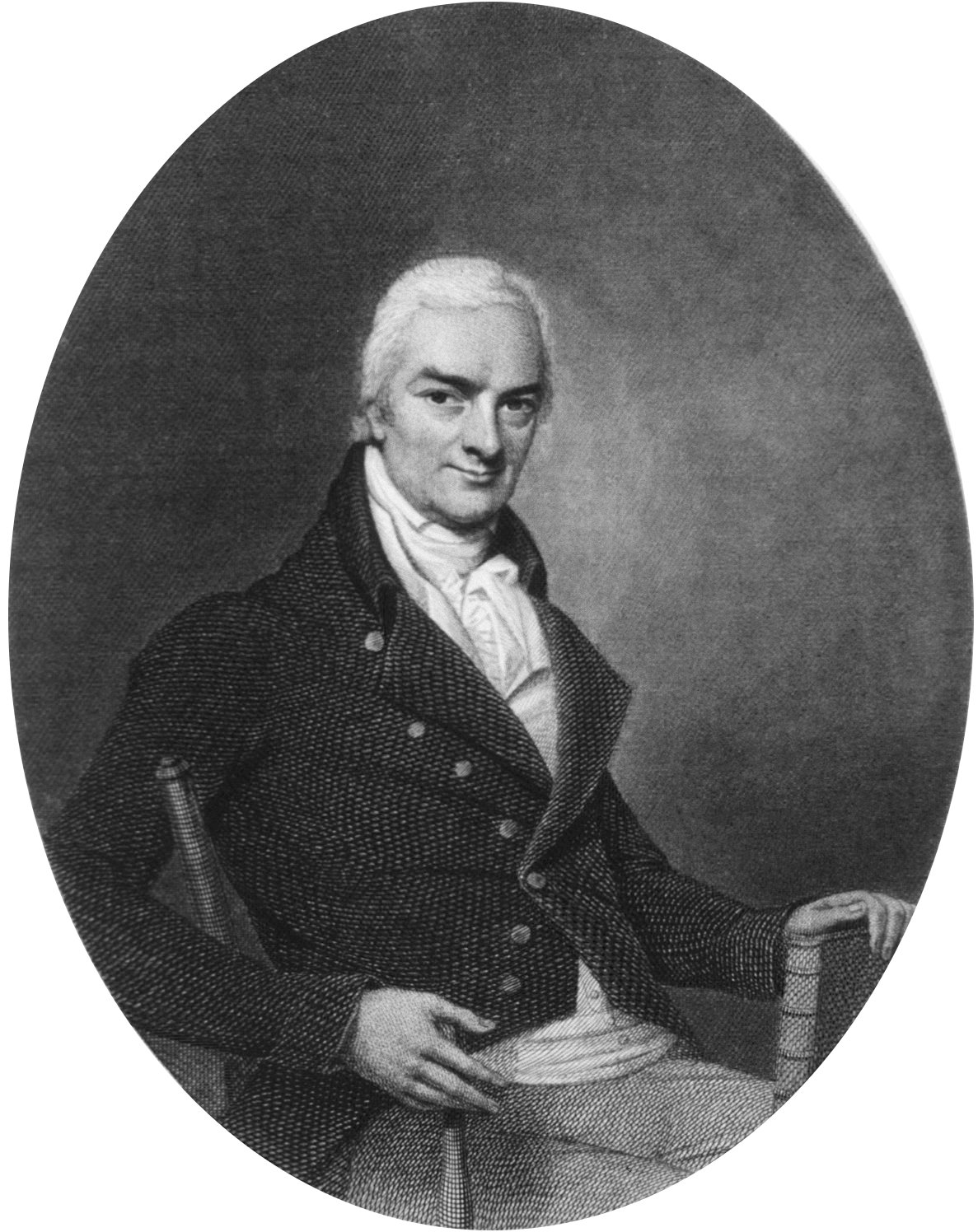
John Haygarth

=== The "Franklin Commission's" legacy ===
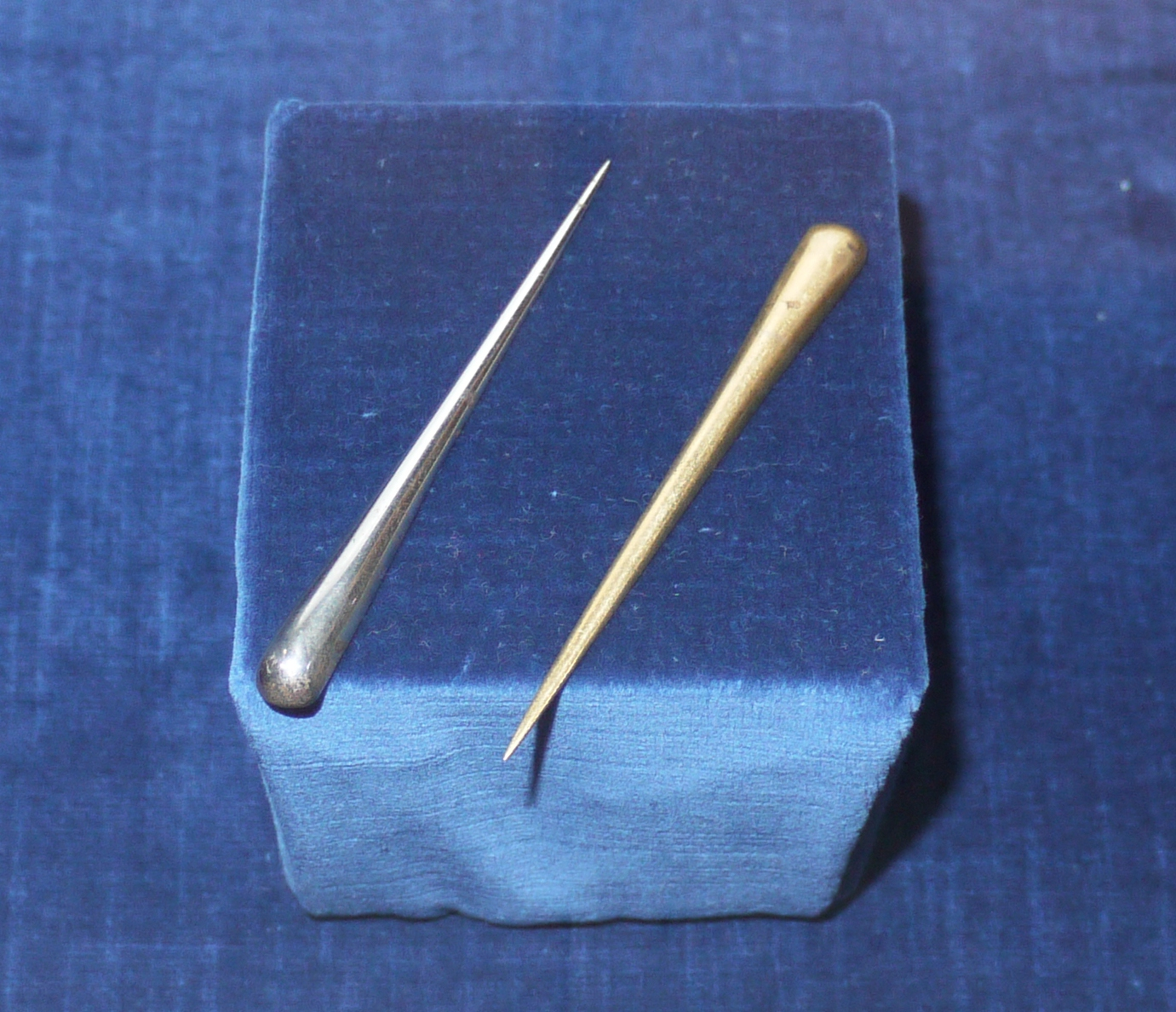
Modern facsimiles of a standard pair of Perkins' Patent Tractors (one made of steel, the other brass)

The "classic" structure of the investigations undertaken by the "Franklin" Commission inspired – among many others over the ensuing years – the (1799) investigations of Chester physician John Haygarth (1740–1827) into the efficacy of Perkins' "tractors".

In the process of discussing the experiments he had conducted (with medical colleagues as witnesses) with (dummy) "wooden tractors" on 7 January 1799, and with Perkins' "true metallick tractors" on 8 January 1799, Haygarth emphasized his considerable debt to the (earlier) "Franklin Commission" enterprise:

It need not be remarked, how completely the trial illustrates the nature of this popular illusion, which has so wonderfully prevailed, and spread so rapidly; it resembles, in a striking manner, that of Animal Magnetism, which merited the attention of Dr. Franklin, when ambassador from America, and of other philosophers at Paris. If any person would repeat these experiments, they should be performed with due solemnity. During the process, the wonderful cures which this remedy is said to have performed ought to be particularly related. Without these indispensable aids, other trials will not prove as successful as those which are above reported. The whole effect undoubtedly depends upon the impression which can be made upon the patient's Imagination.

This method of discovering the truth, distinctly proves to what a surprising degree mere fancy deceives the patient himself; and if the experiment had been tried with the metallick Tractors only, they might and most probably would have deceived even medical observers. Yet this test of truth was perfectly candid. A fair opportunity was offered to discover whether the metallick Tractors possessed any efficacy superior to the ligneous Tractors, or wooden pegs.

— John Haygarth (1801)

== Four vestiges of the magnetization-by-contact practice ==
In relation to the findings of both Commissions – that there was no evidence for d'Eslon's claims, and that d'Eslon's magnetization-by-contact practices had no place within the "medical penumbra" – and despite the consequent, and widespread demedicalization of both d'Eslon's magnetization-by-contact and of animal magnetism in general, there remained a small number of historically significant vestigial remnants of d'Eslon's magnetization-by-contact, the boundary-work of which, for a short while, operated at the frontier of the "medical penumbra" (Brockliss and Jones, 1997) in the (vain) hope of producing an "expansion of the medicable" (such that they would be admitted to conventional medical practice), which were (later) abandoned by their original advocates.

=== Phreno-magnetism ===
In 1843, Robert Hanham Collyer (1814–1891), an American physician and former pupil of John Elliotson, announced that he had discovered the existence of phreno-magnetism in November 1839; and, prior to Collyer's later retraction, two others claimed to have independently confirmed the veracity of Collyer's "discovery": the architect, Henry George Atkinson (1812–1890), at London, in November 1841, and the chemist, Charles Blandford Mansfield (1819–1849), at Cambridge, in December 1841.

Phreno-magnetism, as a practice, involved the physical activation (termed "excitation") of specific "phrenological organs", via the operator's 'magnetisation', directly through the particular cranial area supposedly corresponding to that specific phrenological "organ". It was claimed that, in a suitable subject, whenever an operator "excited" a particular phrenological "organ" the subject would manifest whatever sentiments were considered appropriate to that "organ".

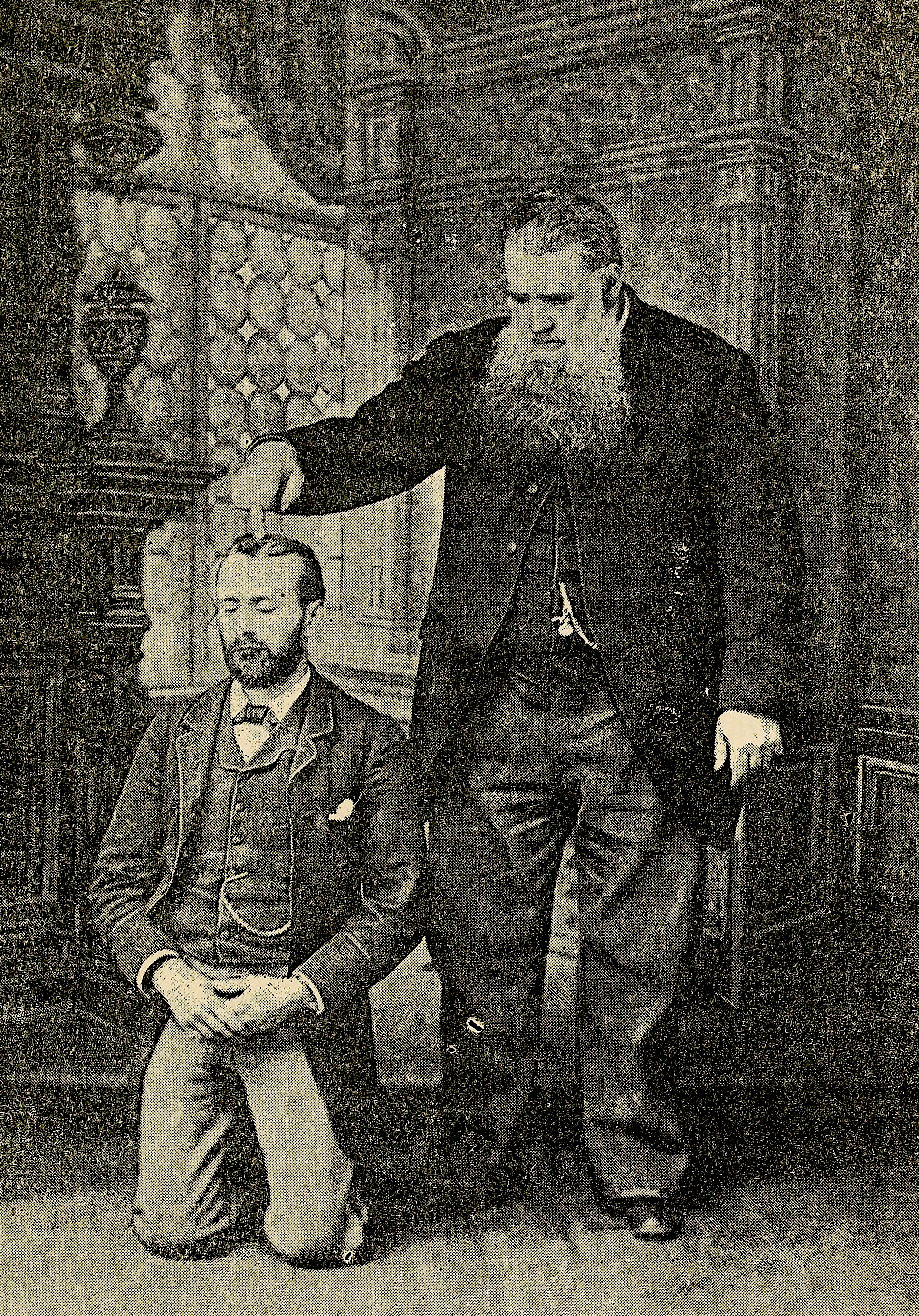
A Phreno-Magnetist "exciting the Organ of Veneration" (1887)

Four years later, by mid-1843, further experiments that had been conducted by Collyer himself had conclusively proved to his own satisfaction that he was mistaken, and Collyer concluded that there was no such thing as phreno-magnetism at all.

Unaware, at the time, of Collyer's retraction, James Braid made a careful examination of "phreno-hypnotism" in December 1842; and continued his comprehensive experimentation until August 1844 – when he concluded, along with John Campbell Colquhoun (Colquhoun, 1843), that there was no foundation for phrenology, in general, and for phreno-magnetism, in particular.

As a consequence of the debunking by Colquhoun, Braid, and others, phreno-magnetism – which, in yet another case of "prima facie plausibility", had (initially) seemed to promise such a wide range of valuable therapeutic and moral applications – "soon morphed into theatrical performances demonstrating the 'reality' of phrenology to credulous audiences, with lecturers pressing specific locations on the cranium of their [magnetised] subjects, and their subjects immediately displaying responses appropriate to the characteristics of each phrenological zone" (Yeates, 2018, p. 56) (see, for example, the figure above).

=== The "zones" of Albert Pitres ===
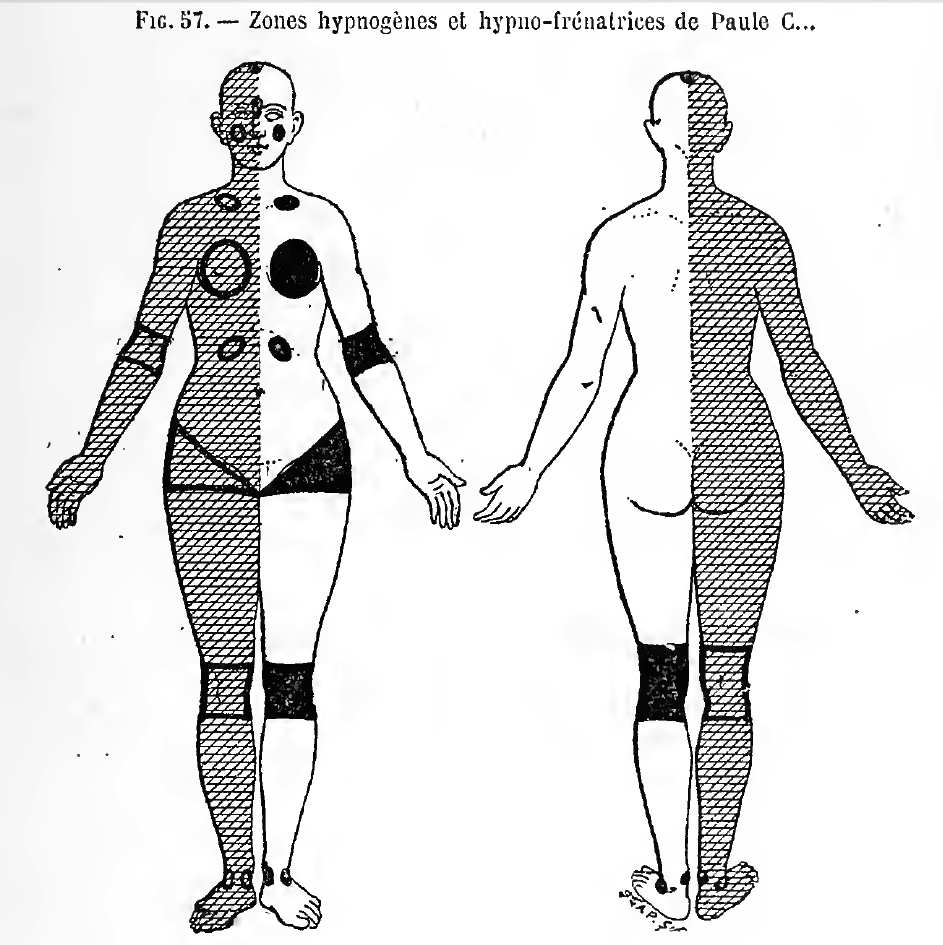
Pitres' diagram of the 'hypnogenetic zones' (subject's left side) and 'hypno-arresting zones' (subject's right side)

Around 1885, the neurologist Albert Pitres – the Dean of the Faculty of Medicine at the University of Bordeaux, and an associate of Charcot at the Salpêtrière hospital – claimed that he had discovered a system of "zones" on the surface of the body, the stimulation of which induced (or terminated) the hypnotic state; namely:

- zones hypnogènes, or "hypnogenetic zones" which, he said, when stimulated, threw people into the hypnotic state, and
- zones hypno-frénatrices, or "hypno-arresting zones", which, he said, when stimulated, abruptly threw people out of that same hypnotic state.

Pitres further claimed that, despite the location of the specific "zones" differing from individual to individual, the location of the relevant "zones" remained constant for each individual: that is, they had a "habitual position" ("position habituelle" (Pitres (1891), p. 497).

There is no evidence that there was ever any independent verification of Pitres' claims.

=== The psychoanalytic couch of Sigmund Freud ===
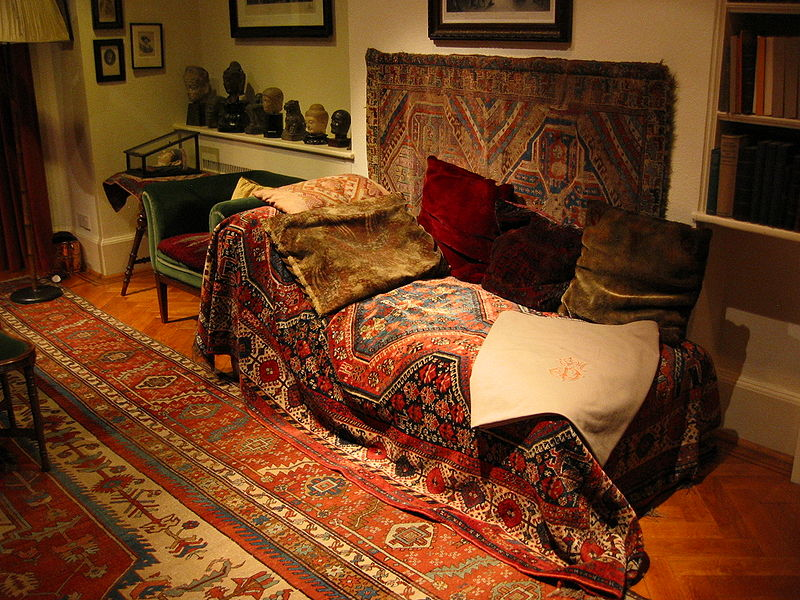
Freud's Couch, with his own chair in its standard position at its head

The noted neurologist and psychoanalyst Sigmund Freud not only studied and wrote about "hypnosis" (e.g., Freud, 1891, and 1966), but he also actively used "hypnosis" in his clinical practice for some time.

However the (à la Salpêtrière) "hypnosis" that Freud employed – quite unlike the conventional "hypnotism" of James Braid (that was induced by Braid's standard "upwards and inwards squint") – relied upon an induction process that often involved rubbing the top of a patient's head. This requirement, of course, demanded that Freud sat at the end of the therapeutic couch – in order to gain easy access to his subject's head – a practice that Freud continued to follow for his entire (post-"hypnosis") professional career.

Another vestige of phreno-magnetism that demanded that Freud position himself at the patient's head was Freud's application of the "head pressure" technique that he had, in person, observed Hippolyte Bernheim use, on one of his visits to Bernheim's clinic at Nancy in 1899.

Freud had discontinued this "head pressure" practice by, at least, 1904 – and, possibly, by 1900.

=== Mistaken identification of Esdaile's Jhar-Phoonk with d’Eslon's magnetization-by-contact ===
Due, to a large extent, to the (mistaken) enthusiastic promotion of Esdaile's (otherwise) valuable work in India as "mesmerism" by John Elliotson (1791–1868), and William Collins Engledue (1813–1858) – especially by Elliotson – in their influential journal, The Zoist, over its fifteen years of existence (March 1843 to January 1856), the entirely mistaken, generally held, and (at the time) widely published view that (the otherwise highly significant) James Esdaile used "mesmerism" to produce the condition under which he conducted completely pain-free surgery is still being repeated in many of the modern accounts of the history of mesmerism, anaesthesia, and hypnotism.

It is clear, however, that – having noticed a vague, and superficial similarity between Esdaile's (Islamic/exorcism derived) Jhar-Phoonk procedures and the (secular/healing derived) "magnetization-by-contact" procedures of d’Eslon – in Esdaile's Jhar-Phoonk, Elliotson and his associates had, to use a biological analogy, (mis)identified in "mesmerism à la d'Eslon" what was a clear case of "homoplasy" (i.e., similar entities descended from an entirely separate lineage) as if it were, instead, a case of "homology" (i.e., similar entities descended from a common ancestor).

== See also ==
- Animal magnetism – Pseudoscientific theory about force in living things
- Blinded experiment – Experiment in which information about the test is masked to reduce bias
- Causality – How one process influences another
- Clinical study design – Plan for research in clinical medicine
- Concept – Fundamental unit of cognition
- Construct (philosophy) – Object whose existence depends upon a subject's mind
- Controlled trial – Form of scientific experiment
- Correlation does not imply causation – Refutation of a logical fallacy
- Design of experiments – Design of tasks
- Élan vital – Hypothetical explanation for evolution and development of organisms
- Emotional contagion – Spontaneous spread of emotions among a group
- Exorcism – Evicting spiritual entities from a person or area
- Experimentum crucis – Critical experiment
- Glass harmonica – Type of musical instrument
- Iatrophysics – Medical application of physics
- Medicus curat, natura sanat – Medical aphorism ("the physician treats, nature heals")
- Mill's Methods – Methods of induction by John Stuart Mill
- Natural history of disease – Progression of a person's medical condition
- Necessity and sufficiency – Terms to describe a conditional relationship between two statements
- Positioning (marketing) – Mental perception of product or brand
- Primum non nocere – Principal precept of bioethics meaning "first, do no harm"
- Protocol (science) – Procedural method for the design and implementation of an experiment
- Protoscience – Research field that may become a science
- Reification (fallacy) – Fallacy of treating an abstraction as if it were a real thing
- Scientific control – Methods employed to reduce error in science tests
- Sham surgery – Faked surgical intervention
- Signs and symptoms – Indications of a specific illness, including psychiatric
- Spurious relationship – Apparent, but false, correlation between causally-independent variables
- Therapeutic effect – Beneficial change in medical condition, often caused by a drug
- Vis medicatrix naturae – Latin phrase affirming the body's self-healing nature
- Vitalism – Belief about living organisms
