= Baron du Potet =

French mesmerist (1796–1881)

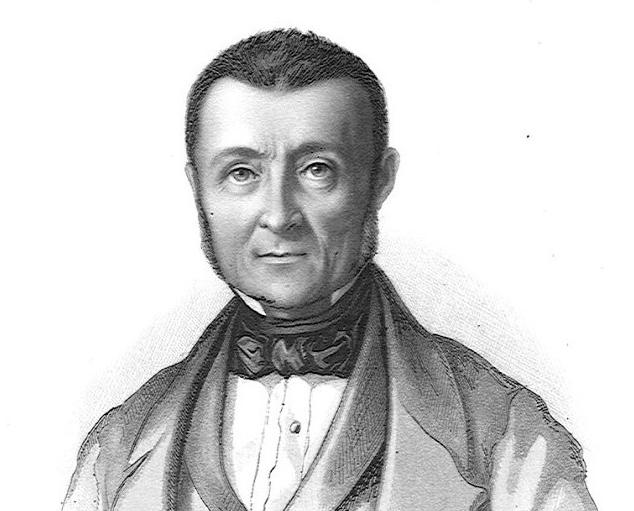
Baron du Potet; frontispiece of La magie dévoilée et la science occulte, 1852 edition.

Jules Denis, Baron du Potet or Dupotet de Sennevoy (12 April 1796 – 1 July 1881) was a French esotericist. He became a renowned practitioner of mesmerism—the theories first developed by Franz Mesmer involving animal magnetism.

== Life ==
He was born at Sennevoy-le-Haut, the son of Charles Jean-Baptiste Dupotet, seigneur de La Chapelle et de Sennevoy, and Pierrette Babeau Simone. He was married twice, to Aglaé Saunier in Paris in 1833, and the second time to Marie Isaure Hérault. He died in Paris and is buried in the Montmartre Cemetery.

== Career ==
Du Potet was a highly successful mesmerist. Some attributed this to the fact he was missing the thumb on his right hand. His reputation was such, apparently, that a man was convicted of murder and executed based on evidence given by "one of Du Potet's clairvoyantes". He operated a free school of magnetism in Paris from 1826 on, and from 1837 to 1845 practised magnetic healing in London, where he successfully treated epileptic girls at the North London Hospital and according to a letter to the editor of The Lancet his experiments became the talk of the town.

For du Potet, who was in correspondence with mesmerists worldwide, mesmerism was, not unlike Utopian socialism, an aid in bringing about social transformation, even a revolution. An 1890 article in the English occult magazine Lucifer praises him as an ardent supporter of mesmerism whose "powerful voice" might have stopped the "travesty" of hypnotism.

Du Potet also pursued occult applications of mesmerism. Eliphas Levi praised him highly in his History of Magic, and said that magnetism had unlocked for him the secrets of magic. Unlike Levi, he believed that trance enabled contact with the dead and with never incarnated spirits, and his circle believed in remote influence by means of magnetic currents. He was a member of the Theosophical Society; his writings were quoted extensively by Helena Blavatsky, who regarded him as an adept. In The Discovery of the Unconscious, Henri Ellenberger considers him to have "developed ... delusions of grandeur".

Du Potet published and edited the Journal du magnetisme from 1845 to 1861. Books he wrote include Introduction to the Study of Animal Magnetism (1838) and La magie dévoilée et la science occulte (1852), a copy of which was owned by Victor Hugo.
