= Charles Lafontaine =

19th-century French showman known for demonstrations of animal magnetism

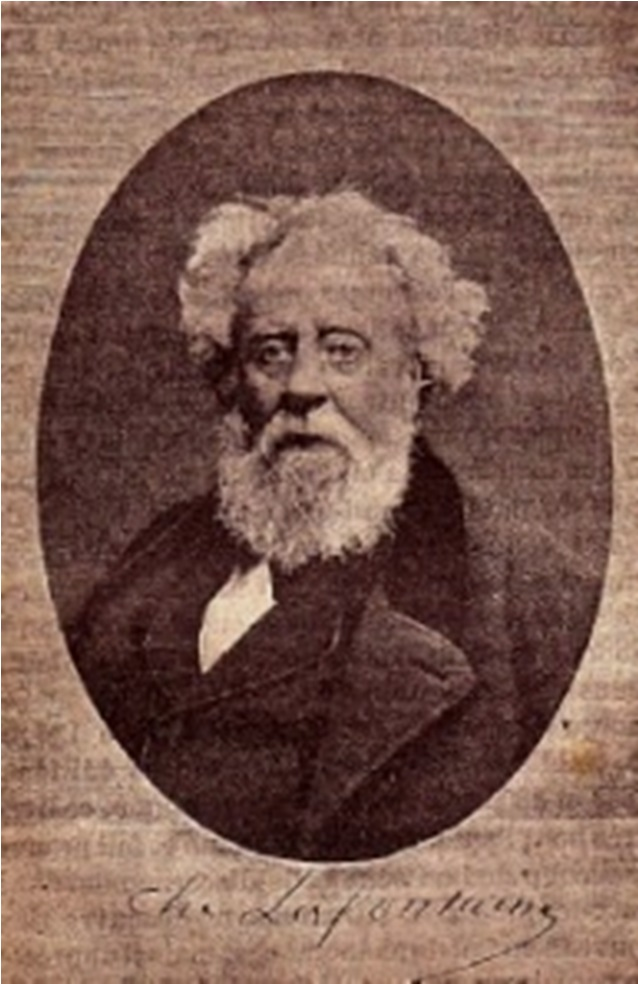
- Born: Charles Léonard Lafontaine; 27 March 1803; Vendôme, Loir-et-Cher, France
- Died: 13 August 1892 (aged 89); Geneva, Switzerland
- Known for: animal magnetism

Charles Léonard Lafontaine (27 March 1803 – 13 August 1892) was a French "public magnetic demonstrator", who also "had an interest in animal magnetism as an agent for curing or alleviating illnesses".

== Family ==
Charles Lafontaine was born in Vendôme, Loir-et-Cher, France, on 27 March 1803. He was related to the famous fabulist, Jean de La Fontaine; and, belonging to a theatrical family, he was involved with the theatre from an early age.

=== Appearance ===
At 5'9" (175 cm) he was of medium height. His dark hair was brushed forward, his expression "rather austere, perhaps thoughtful", and he had a "prodigious" beard. Given the English fashion of the day for a clean-shaven face, Lafontaine’s beard was a subject of some considerable notoriety when he arrived in England – Spencer Timothy Hall's description of Lafontaine at a conversazione in 1841 is typical:

It was by invitation, as a member of the press, that I first attended a mesmeric conversazione. The lamp-lit room in which it was held was large and lofty, and the company numerous. An ample platform was elevated at the end and was occupied on my entrance by the experimenter, whose appearance was calculated to awaken curiosity and wonder in a high degree. He was about middle age, slightly above middle size, with a well-set muscular frame, and was clothed in black. His hair was dark, his eye bold, powerful, and steady; and his beard, which was very profuse, descended to his breast. This was M. La Fontaine ... (Hall, 1845, p. 1)

Richard Harte, former journalist with the New York Telegram, one-time member of the Theosophical Society Adyar (1877-1893), a former editor and regular contributor (often under the nom de guerre "D.C.K.") to The Theosophist, and author of The New Psychology, observed that,

Lafontaine was a man of middle height, inclined to be stout, with a kind and somewhat serious face. When he magnetised he looked like personified concentration. It was often remarked that when a person on being introduced to Lafontaine had talked with him for a little while, he felt as if he had known him for ever so long, which feeling of "old acquaintance" shows that he had an eminently sympathetic nature. (Harte, Hypnotism and the Doctors, p. 66.)

== Animal magnetism ==
He was introduced to mesmerism in Brussels, in 1831, by the Belgian lithographer, inventor, and scholar Jean Baptiste Ambroise Marcelin Jobard (1792–1861), who later become the director of the Royal Museum of Industry at Brussels. He then went on to study the works of Marquis de Puységur (1751–1825) and Joseph-Philippe-François Deleuze (1753–1835) and, abandoning the theatre altogether, he began touring parts of Europe.

A detailed description of Lafontaine's magnetization technique, translated directly from the text of the fifth (1886) edition of his L'art de magnétiser, is presented at Hart (1903), pp. 66–69.

== United Kingdom ==
He decided to come to England in June 1841, and soon began to lecture in London. According to Goldsmith (1934, p. 225), Lafontaine "attracted considerable attention by mesmerizing a lion in the London Zoo".

Lafontaine had almost no English at all, and had to use interpreters; also, he traveled with young assistants, one of whom was identified as ‘Eugene’ (or M. Eugéne), a French youth approximately 18, and a number of young (English) women who assisted him from time to time. On leaving London, he conducted “a lengthy tour of the provinces, visiting Birmingham, Manchester, Leeds, Sheffield, Nottingham, Leicester, Liverpool, Ireland and Scotland” (Gauld, 1992, p. 204). Although, from time to time, Lafontaine ‘treated’ individuals, he was principally what Gauld (1992, p. 203) describes as a “magnetic demonstrator”; and, on most of the occasions in which he had provided ‘treatment’, the events were intended to be demonstrations, rather than the expression of the activities of a professional therapist.

=== James Braid ===
Manchester surgeon, James Braid's first direct observation of the operation, and associated phenomena, of animal magnetism was at Lafontaine's third Manchester conversazione on 13 November 1841. Braid always maintained that he had gone to Lafontaine's demonstration as an open-minded sceptic – eager to examine the evidence and, then, form a considered opinion of Lafontaine's work. He was neither a closed-minded cynic intent on destroying Lafontaine, nor a deluded and naïvely credulous believer seeking authorization of his already formed belief.

Braid was amongst the medical men who were invited onto the platform by Lafontaine. Braid examined the physical condition of Lafontaine's magnetised subjects (especially their eyes and their eyelids) and concluded that they were, indeed, in quite a different physical state. Braid always stressed the significance of his attending Lafontaine’s conversazione in the development of the theories, techniques, and practices of hypnotism. In Neurypnology (1843, pp. 34–35) he states that he had earlier been totally convinced by a four-part investigation of Animal Magnetism published in The London Medical Gazette (i.e., Anon, 1838) that there was no evidence of any magnetic agency at all. The concluding paragraph of the final article read:

This, then, [in conclusion,] is our case. Every credible effect of magnetism has occurred, and every incredible is said to have occurred, in cases where no magnetic influence has been exerted, but in all which, excited imagination, irritation, or some powerful mental impression, has operated: where the mind has been alone acted on, magnetic effects have been produced without magnetic manipulations: where magnetic manipulations have been employed, unknown, and therefore without the assistance of the mind, no result has ever been produced. Why, then, imagine a new agent, which cannot act by itself, and which has never yet even seemed to produce a new phenomenon?

And, as well as the strong impression made upon Braid by the Medical Gazette's article, there was also the more recent impressions made by Thomas Wakley’s exposure of the comprehensive fraud of John Elliotson’s subjects, the Okey sisters,

[all of which] determined me to consider the whole as a system of collusion or illusion, or of excited imagination, sympathy, or imitation. I therefore abandoned the subject as unworthy of farther investigation, until I attended the conversazioni of Lafontaine, where I saw one fact, the inability of a patient to open his eyelids, which arrested my attention; I felt convinced it was not to be attributed to any of the causes referred to, and I therefore instituted experiments to determine the question; and exhibited the results to the public in a few days after. — (Braid, Neurypnology (1843), p. 35; emphasis added).

Braid attended two more of Lafontaine's conversazione (his fourth and fifth). By the fifth (on Saturday 20 November 1841), Braid was convinced of the veracity of some of Lafontaine's effects and phenomena; and, in particular, whilst Braid was convinced that a transformation from, so to speak, condition_{1} to condition_{2}, and back to condition_{1} had really taken place, he was convinced that no magnetic agency of any sort (as Lafontaine claimed) was responsible for these veridical events. He also rejected outright the assertion that the transformation in question had "proceeded from, or [had been] excited into action by another [person]" (Neurypnology, p. 32).

On returning home on the evening of Saturday 20 November 1841, Braid performed his experimentum crucis; and, operating on the principle of Occam's Razor (that 'entities ought not to be multiplied beyond necessity'), and recognizing that he could diminish, rather than multiply entities, Braid made an extraordinary decision to perform a role-reversal and treat the operator-subject interaction as subject-internal, operator-guided procedure; rather than, as Lafontaine supposed, an operator-centred, subject-external procedure. Braid emphatically proved his point by his self-experimentation with his "upwards and inwards squint". In other words, rather than it being due, as Lafontaine supposed, to the charismatic influence of the operator's downward gaze, compounding the transfer of magnetic fluid that was supposedly being transferred, via the operator, through the subject's thumbs which were being tightly held by the operator, it was a simple biophysiological reflex produced by the subject's upward gaze.

And, further, Braid's use of 'self-' or 'auto-hypnotism' (rather than 'hetero-hypnotism'), entirely by himself, on himself, and within his own home, clearly demonstrated that it had nothing whatsoever to do with the 'gaze', 'charisma', or 'magnetism' of the operator — all it needed was a subject's 'fixity of vision' on an 'object of concentration' at such a height and such a distance from the bridge of their nose that the desired 'upwards and inwards squint' was achieved. And, at the same time, by using himself as a subject, Braid also conclusively proved that none of Lafontaine's phenomena were due to magnetic agency. Braid conducted a number of experiments with self-hypnotization upon himself, and, by now convinced that he had discovered the natural psycho-physiological mechanism underlying these quite genuine effects, he performed his first act of hetero-hypnotization at his own residence, before several witnesses, including Captain Thomas Brown (1785–1862) on Monday 22 November 1841 – his first hypnotic subject was Mr. J. A. Walker. (see Neurypnology, pp. 16–20.)

The following Saturday (27 November 1841), Braid delivered his first public lecture at the Manchester Athenæum, in which, among other things, he was able to demonstrate that he could replicate the effects produced by Lafontaine, without the need for any sort of physical contact between the operator and the subject.

=== M‘Neile's "Satanic Agency and Mesmerism" sermon ===
On the evening of Sunday, 10 April 1842, the controversial Liverpool cleric Hugh M‘Neile preached against "Mesmerism" for more than ninety minutes to a capacity congregation. He began, speaking of "latter days" – following which, Christ would return to Earth, and peace would reign for 1,000 years – and how, as the second advent neared, "satanic agency amongst men" would become ever more obvious; and, then, moving into a confusing admixture of philippic (against both Lafontaine and Braid, as, among other things, "necromancers"), and polemic (against animal magnetism), where he concluded that all mesmeric phenomena were due to "satanic agency".

The sermon was reported on at some length in the Liverpool Standard, two days later; with all other newspaper reports being derived from the Liverpool Standard reporter's account. M‘Neile allowed the entire text of his original sermon, as transcribed by a stenographer (more than 7,500 words), to be published on Wednesday, 4 May 1842. M‘Neile's publication forced Braid to publish his own response as a pamphlet; which he did on Saturday, 4 June 1842. There is no contemporary record of any response by Lafontaine, either in print, or verbally in his lectures.

In 1866, a long way from 1842 Liverpool, Lafontaine presented a story – which it is not reported in any of the contemporary newspaper accounts — in which he claimed that, "to Mac Neil’s great mortification", (a) the Liverpool public (in particular women) flocked in droves to his 12 April lecture; (b) that (his interpreter) Nottingham was extremely caustic in his ridicule of the credulity, superstition and ignorance displayed by M‘Neile; and (c) "to the audience’s delight", Nottingham had loudly demanded M‘Neile’s presence, along with official church documents attesting that Lafontaine’s magnetic practices were damnable (1866, I, p. 342).

In another of Lafontaine's (unsubstantiated from any other source) accounts in his "memoirs", he claims that, at some unspecified time several years later, he was dining in Paris with "baronet sir Richard Dennis" [sic], who introduced him to M‘Neile. M‘Neile, who was, initially, "outraged by [Lafontaine’s] presence", allegedly calmed down a little when "Dennis" explained that Lafontaine was "the rescuer of the baronet’s two nieces". Lafontaine conducted several experiments on a somnambulist (whom he had 'conveniently' brought along with him); and the success of his experiments, according to Lafontaine, "removed the blindfold from poor Mr. Mac Neil", and, at last, allowed him to see the truth of animal magnetism.

=== Financial disaster ===
Overall, Lafontaine's tour of the United Kingdom was a financial disaster; and, perhaps, largely due to the impact of M‘Neile's sermon, Lafontaine’s subsequent lecture tour of the north was a complete financial failure, and just before he returned to France, and he was forced to send a letter to a supporter in Leeds, subsequently published in the Leeds Mercury of 17 September 1842, requesting funds.

Writing in 1843, John Elliotson observed that it seemed clear that Lafontaine came to England for "pecuniary" reasons, and left because he eventually "found the affair unsuccessful". Despite Elliotson's view that Lafontaine was "a less educated man" than Jules du Potet de Sennevoy (who had visited England four years earlier), he felt that Lafontaine’s visit had done "great good", and "more ostensible good" than had that of du Potet de Sennevoy "because [Lafontaine] came at a period when the conviction of the truth [of mesmerism] had become much more diffused, and persons were more disposed to attend to the subject".

== France and Europe ==
He returned to France in late 1842, and subsequently travelled widely around Europe and the Mediterranean.

=== Naples ===
According to his own account, Lafontaine visited Naples in 1849 and — having restored sight and hearing to some — was accused of blasphemously replicating the miracles of Christ. This placed him in controversial circumstances, and he was fortunate that the French Consul intervened on his behalf at the King’s Ministerial Council; and, according to Lafontaine, due to the Consul’s representations, King Ferdinand II (1810-1859) eventually made a royal decree: "I consent to M. Lafontaine remaining in Naples, on the condition that will he not restore sight to the blind, or hearing to the deaf".

=== Pope Pius IX ===
"Having removed all misconceptions, foretelling of the future, explicit or implicit invocation of the devil, the use of animal magnetism is indeed merely an act of making use of physical media that are otherwise licit and hence it is not morally forbidden, provided it does not tend toward an illicit end or toward anything depraved." — The Sacred Congregation of the Holy Office: 28 July 1847.

Soon after leaving Naples, he was granted an audience with Giovanni Maria Mastai-Ferretti (1792-1878), or Pope Pius IX, in Rome on 14 November 1849. At the beginning of their discussion, having agreed that such things as ‘electricity’ and ‘magnetism’ were natural, and having read King Ferdinand’s decree, the Pope raised the issue of the possible dangers of ‘animal magnetism’. After some discussion with Lafontaine (in which Lafontaine claimed to have cured many ‘incurable’ diseases, including paralysis, epilepsy, and restored the faculties to the permanently deaf, mute, and blind) and some extensive demonstrations involving both the physical methods of intervention and the consequent manifestations (Lafontaine remarks that the time spent was far longer the usual four to five minutes allocated to such audiences) the Pope is said to have remarked: "Well! Mr. Lafontaine, let us wish and hope that, for the good of humanity, animal-magnetism may soon be generally employed".

=== Switzerland ===
He returned to France in January 1850; and, soon after, moved to Switzerland, where he remained until his death.

=== Le Magnétiseur ===
He published the journal Le Magnétiseur: Journal du Magnétisme Animal in Geneva from 1859 to 1872.

=== Louis Ladé and François-Auguste Ladé ===
In April 1868, an 18 years old, Amélie Patonier, died as a consequence of incompetent treatment that had been delivered by the Swiss physician François-Auguste Ladé (1841–1866). A lethal over-dose of morphine had been administered to the young woman within a mixture that had been prepared by Louis Ladé, a trained pharmacist, and father of the physician in question.

The girl’s death was investigated in a very unsatisfactory fashion and, despite much evidence pointing to the incompetence and malpractice of both Ladés, neither was put on trial. The girl’s father, Jean-Pierre Patonier, published a pamphlet, giving precise details of the evidence that had been provided to the coroner, denouncing the failure of the justice system.

Lafontaine reprinted the text of Patonier's pamphlet, with some additional supportive editorial commentary in the September 1868 edition of Le Magnétiseur, under the title "Un Scandale medical"; Lafontaine was sued for libel but by the civil judgement of April 9, 1869, Dr. Ladé's claim was dismissed, notably because Judge Bellamy considered that Mr. Lafontaine was within his rights.

== Death ==
Lafontaine died in Geneva, Switzerland on 13 August 1892, a comparatively wealthy man.
