= The Discovery of the Unconscious =

1970 book by Henri Ellenberger

The Discovery of the Unconscious: The History and Evolution of Dynamic Psychiatry
- Cover of the first edition
- Author: Henri F. Ellenberger
- Language: English
- Subject: Dynamic psychiatry
- Publisher: Basic Books
- Publication date: 1970
- Publication place: United States
- Media type: Print (Hardcover and Paperback)
- Pages: 932
- ISBN: 0-465-01672-3
- OCLC: 68543

The Discovery of the Unconscious: The History and Evolution of Dynamic Psychiatry is a 1970 book about the history of dynamic psychiatry by the Swiss medical historian Henri F. Ellenberger, in which the author discusses such figures as Franz Anton Mesmer, Sigmund Freud, Pierre Janet, Alfred Adler, and Carl Jung. The book was first published in the United States by Basic Books. The work has become a classic, and has been credited with correcting older estimates of Freud's level of originality and encouraging scholars to question the scientific validity of psychoanalysis.

== Summary ==
Ellenberger presents a history of dynamic psychiatry, providing discussions of figures such as doctor Franz Anton Mesmer, Sigmund Freud (the founder of psychoanalysis), psychologist Pierre Janet, psychotherapist Alfred Adler, and psychiatrist Carl Jung. He discusses "the personality of the pioneers, their environment, and the role of certain patients."

== Publication history ==
The Discovery of the Unconscious was first published by Basic Books in 1970.

== Reception ==
The Discovery of the Unconscious is the book for which Ellenberger is best remembered. The psychologist, Frank Sulloway, described the book as an "impressively erudite if also much-disputed" work. He credited Ellenberger with doing "more than any other student of Freud's life" to question false claims about Freud's achievements. The psychoanalyst Joel Kovel described the book as "useful because of its encyclopaedic nature". Nevertheless, he concluded that it has "little critical value or real historical analysis."

Psychologist Hans Eysenck called The Discovery of the Unconscious a "classic" and an "excellent book which unveils many of the myths which have accumulated around Freud". Critic Frederick Crews considered the book part of a body of research demonstrating that Freud "was misled by his drive toward heroic fame." Crews wrote that Ellenberger reveals "the derivative and curiously atavistic position of psychoanalysis in nineteenth century psychiatry", adding that "no one who ponders the entirety of Ellenberger's subtly ironic narrative can fail to come away with a sense that psychoanalysis was a high-handed improvisation on Freud's part." Crews also credited Ellenberger with a biographical understanding of Freud that "set a standard that contemporary scholars are still trying to match", and with revising older estimates of Freud's level of originality and encouraging subsequent scholars to question the scientific validity of psychoanalysis.

Historian Peter Gay described The Discovery of the Unconscious as useful despite Ellenberger's lack of sympathy for Freud. Gay called the book a "thoroughly researched" volume that was far more comprehensive than Lancelot Law Whyte's The Unconscious before Freud (1960). Gay added that, "Though far from elegant, though opinionated and not always reliable in its quick judgments (such as its verdict that Freud was the quintessential Viennese), it is a rich source of information."

Psychiatrist Anthony Stevens made use of Ellenberger's concept of "creative illness" in his account of Jung. Historian Paul Robinson wrote that The Discovery of the Unconscious paved the way for much of the criticism of Freud that followed in the 1980s. Historian of science Roger Smith called the book "a magisterial – and readable – historical study". Psychologist Louis Breger considered the book "extremely valuable". He credited Ellenberger with placing Freud's work in context, as well as with providing illuminating discussions of Adler, Jung, and Janet. Philosopher Mikkel Borch-Jacobsen and psychologist Sonu Shamdasani called the book a "monumental work".

== See also ==
- Decline and Fall of the Freudian Empire
