= Étienne Félix d'Henin de Cuvillers =

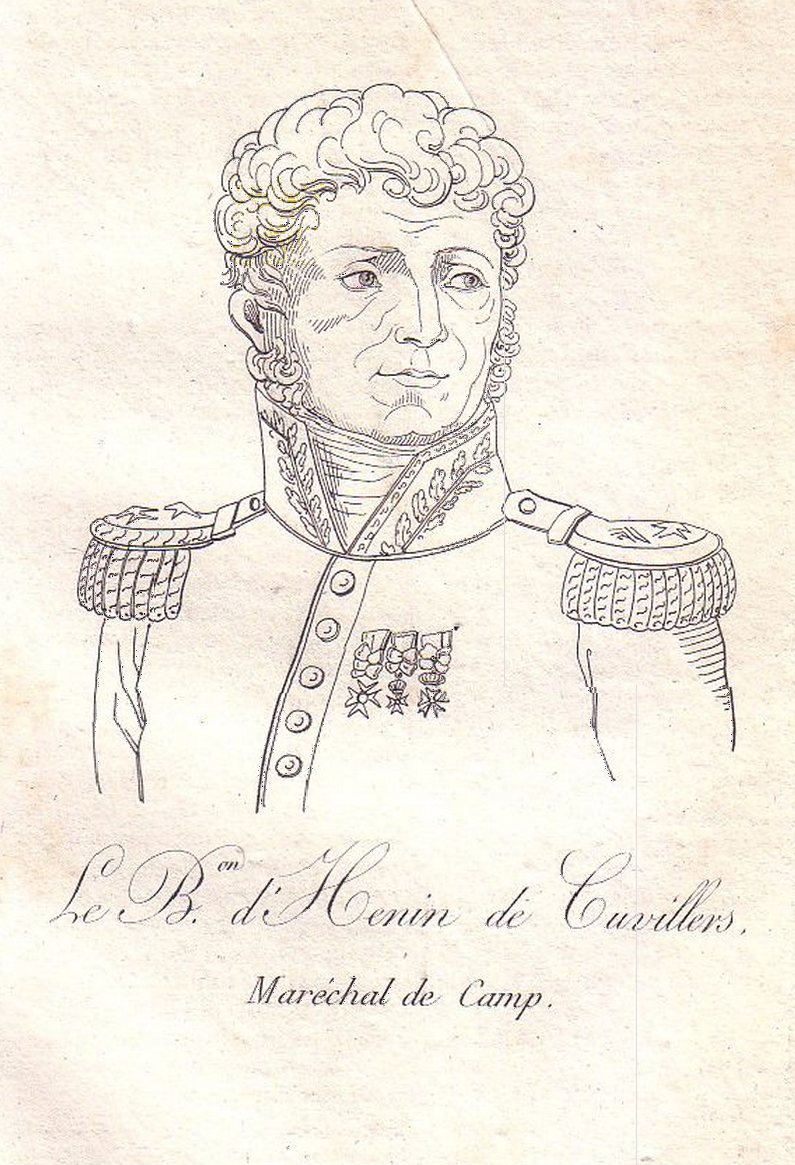
Étienne Félix d'Henin de Cuvillers

Étienne Félix d'Henin de Cuvillers (1755–1841) was a French magnetizer and an early practitioner of mesmerism as a scientific discipline. He's best known for coining the term hypnotism.

Hénin de Cuvillers was a follower of Franz Anton Mesmer (1734–1815). However, unlike Mesmer he did not believe in the existence of a "magnetic fluid" in animal magnetism, and instead emphasized the role of mental processes in mesmerism. In his book Le magnétisme éclairé (The Enlightened Magnetism), he describes accounts of mesmeric effects in terms of belief and suggestibility.

He is credited for popularizing a system of scientific nomenclature by using the prefix "hypn" in words such as hypnotique (hypnotic), hypnotisme (hypnotism) and hypnotiste (hypnotist). He used these terms as early as 1820, and is believed by many to have coined these names. In 1820 he became editor of the Archives du Magnetisme Animal (Archives of Animal Magnetism).
