= Hugh M'Neile =

British priest (1795–1879)

The Very Reverend Hugh M‘Neile
- Dean of Ripon
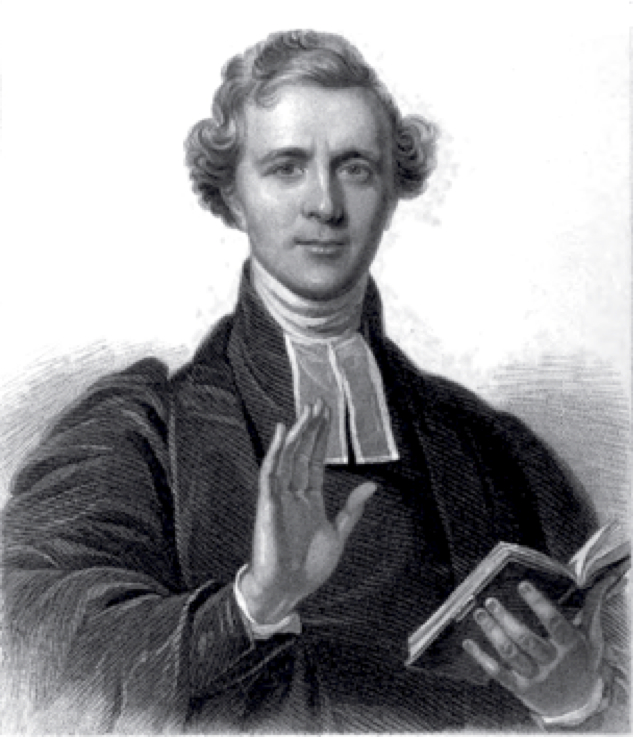
- Church: Church of England
- Province: York
- Diocese: Ripon
- Installed: 29 October 1868
- Term ended: 31 October 1875
- Predecessor: William Goode
- Successor: Sydney Turner

Orders
- Ordination: 1820 by William Magee

Personal details
- Born: Hugh Boyd M‘Neile; 17 July 1795 Ballycastle, County Antrim
- Died: 28 January 1879 (aged 83) Bournemouth
- Buried: Bournemouth New Cemetery
- Denomination: Anglican
- Parents: Alexander M‘Neile (1762–1838) and Mary M‘Neile (née McNeale)
- Spouse: Anne Magee (1803–1881)
- Children: 16
- Occupation: Anglican cleric
- Education: Trinity College Dublin

Hugh Boyd M‘Neile (18 July 1795 – 28 January 1879) was a well-connected and controversial Irish-born Calvinist Anglican of Scottish descent.

He was anti-Tractarian and anti-Roman Catholic (and, even more so, anti-Anglo-Catholic) and an Evangelical and millenarian cleric, who was also an advocate of the year-for-a-day principle, M‘Neile was the perpetual curate of St Jude's Liverpool (1834–1848), the perpetual curate of St Paul's Princes Park (1848–1867), an honorary canon of Chester Cathedral (1845–1868) and the Dean of Ripon (1868–1875).

He was a member of the Protestant Association (in its 19th-century incarnation), the London Society for Promoting Christianity among the Jews, the Irish Society, the Church Missionary Society, and the Church Association.

M‘Neile was an influential demagogue, a renowned public speaker, an evangelical cleric and an opponent of "Popery", who was inflamed by the increasing number of Irish Roman Catholics in Liverpool. He was known for his stirring oratory, his immoderate preaching, and his many publications. He was loved, admired and respected by some and he was an object of derision and scorn for others.

== Family ==
Hugh Boyd M‘Neile, the younger son of Alexander M'Neile (1762–1838) and Mary M'Neile, née McNeale (?–1852), was born at Ballycastle, County Antrim on 17 July 1795, just three years before the Irish Rebellion of 1798; and, in 1798, M‘Neile was taken by his mother from Ballycastle to relatives in Scotland, in an open boat, to escape the dangers and atrocities of "the troubles" associated with the Irish Rebellion (Boyd, 1968).

M‘Neile's father owned considerable property (including the large farm at Collier's Hall), was a Justice of the Peace and served as the High Sheriff of the County of Antrim. His brother, John M‘Neile (1788–1855), having made his fortune in South America, returned to Ireland and was one of the founding members of the Northern Bank, the first bank in Belfast. John M‘Neile married Charlotte Lavinia Dallas (1803–1859) on 11 June 1823 and had two sons, Henry Hugh (1829–?) and Alexander John (1842–?) and one daughter, Mary Harriet (1833–1919), who married Hugh McCalmont Cairns (1810–1885), the First Earl Cairns, who served as Attorney General in the third Derby–Disraeli ministry (10 July 1866 – 29 October 1866), as Lord Chancellor in the first and second Disraeli ministries, and as (opposition) Conservative Leader in the House of Lords (1869–1870).

M‘Neile was 6 feet 3 inches (191 cm) tall, extremely strong, intelligent, a good horseman and considered by most to be extremely handsome.

In 1822 M‘Neile married Anne Magee (1803–1881), the fourth daughter of William Magee (1766–1831), the Archbishop of Dublin. They had sixteen children (four of whom died early in life): three daughters, two of whom remained unmarried, and thirteen sons. As a testament to his influence, a number of his children went on to have distinguished careers, including:

- Alexander M‘Neile (1823–1912)
- Colonel William M‘Neile (1824–1870), Commissioner of Punjab.
- Elizabeth M‘Neile (1827–1910)
- Hugh M‘Neile (1828–1842), who was killed, aged 14, in an accident with a loaded pistol.
- Mary M‘Neile (1831–?)
- Daniel James M‘Neile (1835–1874), of the Bengal Civil Service.
- John Magee M‘Neile (1837–1898)
- Anne M‘Neile (1838–?)
- The Revd Edmund Hugh M‘Neile (1840–1893), an honorary canon of Liverpool (1880–1893), also served at St Paul's, Prince's Park, Liverpool (1867–1893) and as chaplain to the Bishop of Chester (1877–1884). He married Cecilia Elizabeth (1841–1929), daughter of Sir Thomas Francis Fremantle, Lord Cottesloe (1798–1890).
- Charles M‘Neile (1841–1925)
- The Revd Hector M‘Neile (1843–1922), a fellow of St John's College, Cambridge (1865–1871), the vicar of Bredbury, Cheshire (1893–1900), a missionary of the Church Missionary Society in Bombay (1900–1907) and vicar of Bishop's Sutton, Hampshire (1907–1922). He married Mary Rosa Lush. One of his three sons, the Revd Robert Fergus M‘Neile, and two of his daughters, Annie Hilda M‘Neile and Jessie Margaret M‘Neile, served as missionaries in Egypt and Palestine. His third daughter, Ethel Rhoda M‘Neile (1875–1922), served as a missionary in India.
- Captain Malcolm M‘Neile (1845–1923), R.N., Governor, Royal Naval Prison at Lewes.
- Norman Frederick M‘Neile (1846–1929), Known as "the blind vicar", he was born on 14 August 1846 and served at St Peter's Brafferton Parish Church in Helperby, Yorkshire for 50 years. Married to Clara Cecilia Willink (1852–1929) in July 1881. He was completely blind from the age of 12.

== Education ==
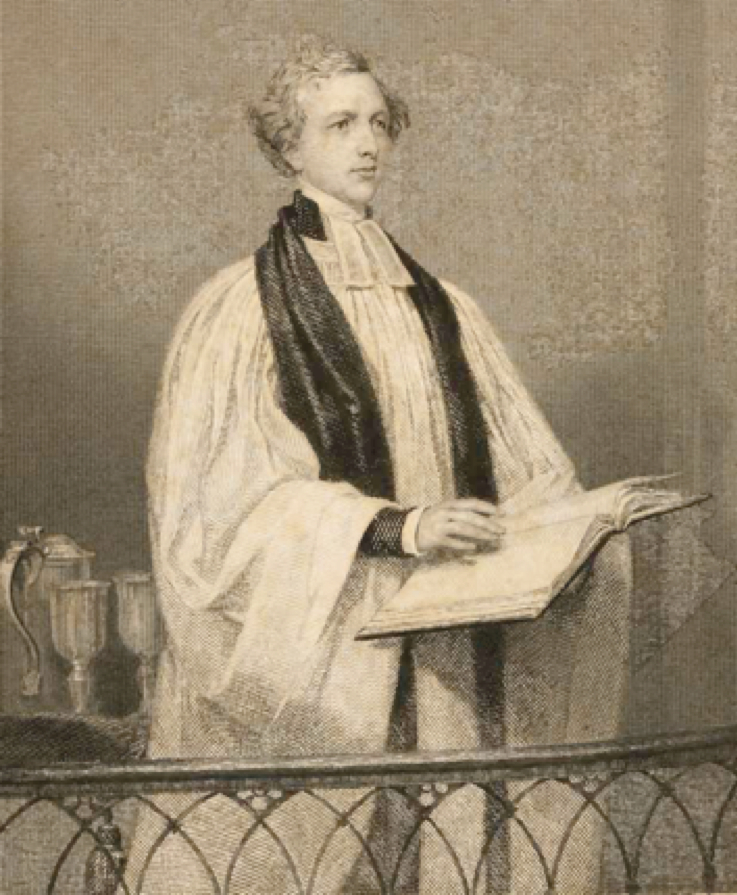
M‘Neile in 1840

M‘Neile received a private education. He entered Trinity College Dublin in 1810, and graduated Artium Baccalaureus (AB), with a good degree in classics in 1815. He also began legal studies at The King's Inns in Dublin and, having served all his terms there, transferred to London's Lincoln's Inn in 1814. He almost completed his terms there as well when, around 1819, he decided to abandon the law as well as the political career that his family had anticipated for him and return to his studies in order to qualify for ordination. He graduated Magister Artium, at Dublin University in 1822.

In 1847, M‘Neilee graduated Bachelor of Divinity (BD) and Doctor of Divinity (DD) from Dublin University. In essence, the BD degree was a coursework and postgraduate degree only available to those who had graduated MA at least 10 years earlier; the DD was conventionally awarded simultaneously on the basis of published work. In M‘Neile's case the published work would have been The Church and the Churches (1846).

On 16 June 1860, an Incorporate DD – i.e., a doctorate ad eundem gradum ("to the same degree"), admitting M‘Neile as a member of Cambridge University by virtue of his possession of a DD from another university (Trinity College Dublin) – was conferred upon him at Cambridge University.

== Early adulthood ==
While a student, and preparing for a career in the law, M‘Neile loved the theatre even more than the fashionable society in which he moved. He attended the theatre in Dublin, London and Bath as often as he could. In those days, Sarah Siddons, her brother John, and Eliza O'Neill (later Lady Wrixon-Becher) – all favourites of M‘Neile – were at their peak; and his later platform and pulpit performances drew very heavily on their example.

When M‘Neile was 20, his father's unmarried brother, Lieutenant-General Daniel M’Neile (1754–1826), returned to Ireland following distinguished service with the East India Company. His uncle, who settled in Bath, delighted in M’Neile's company, and his uncle virtually adopted him; and, it seemed, he was the heir presumptive to his uncle's considerable fortune. His uncle, whose wealth and influence would have easily have procured M‘Neile a seat in parliament, and who understood that success at the bar would be a stepping-stone for the talented lad into a productive political career, encouraged him to pursue a legal career. He took his A.B. in 1815, and continued his legal studies.

Most of his time between 1815 and 1819 was spent with his uncle in Bath. In 1816 he and his uncle travelled extensively on the continent, enjoying the social advantages of his uncle's influence. In the process, M’Neile spent time with mixing with influential people, such as Madame de Staël (1766–1817) and Lord Byron (1788–1824).

In the middle of 1816, while staying with his uncle in a Swiss village inn, M’Neile fell very seriously ill. His life was saved by the medical intervention of Henry Brougham (1778–1868), a stranger to M’Neile at the time, who had called at the inn for refreshment (or a change of horses). Upon his return to England, a changed M’Neile began reading the Bible daily and, around 1819, he experienced a conversion to Christianity within the Evangelical Anglican tradition. To his uncle's dismay, he hinted that he might give away law and politics and dedicate his life to the church. According to most accounts, when he finally announced that he was embracing church ministry as a profession, his greatly disappointed uncle "disinherited" him.

== Clerical career ==
Following his theological studies, M‘Neile was ordained in 1820 by his future father-in-law, William Magee (1766–1831) – who, at that time, was the Church of Ireland's Bishop of Raphoe – and served as a curate in Stranorlar, County Donegal from 1820 to 1821. Early in 1822, his preaching in London so impressed the banker and parliamentarian Henry Drummond (1786–1860) that Drummond appointed M‘Neile to the living of the parish of Albury, Surrey, from where M‘Neile's first collection of sermons, Seventeen Sermons, etc., were published in 1825.

From 1826 to 1830, Drummond hosted the annual Albury Conferences, held in Albury for the Union of the Students of Prophecy moderated by M‘Neile. Each of the Albury Conferences involved days full of close and laborious study of the prophetical books of the Bible; attempting to seek out as-yet-unfulfilled prophecies within them. As they progressed, "[their] prophetic speculations became more and more extreme". It was at Albury that M‘Neile first met Edward Irving (1792–1834). Irving was a strong believer in the "gifts" of "speaking in tongues" (glossolalia) and spiritual healing. It was through Irving that M‘Neile first encountered the Irish-born Okey Sisters. His experience of the deception of the Okey Sisters' reputed speaking in tongues with Irving, and his knowledge of their later association with Elliotson and his mesmerism, and their well-attested fraudulent deception of Elliotson, must have strongly informed his later views of the activities of magnetists such as Lafontaine.

In relation to the reputed prophecy, glossolalia and healing, M‘Neile became increasingly torn between his own developing view that they were not of the Holy Spirit of and his desire to remain loyal to Drummond who thought that they were. In the early 1830s, while still within the "Prophetic Circle", M‘Neile had dabbled with spiritual healing and speaking with tongues himself.

By July 1832, M‘Neile was preaching at Albury against the reputed spiritual gifts and was protesting about Drummond's private prayer meetings, because, equating Drummond's residence to a church, M‘Neile "would not suffer laymen to pray in his presence". Further, he most strongly objected "[that] it was not of God" when a female at one of Drummond's prayer sessions, which M‘Neile had "attended reluctantly", spoke in tongues – and, thus, "contradicting the biblical injunction against women teaching in church". This caused such a rift that Drummond said "if [M‘Neile] persisted in preaching against the work of the Lord and against all who believed in it" he would be unable to remain within the Church of England. Soon after, Drummond ceased attending services at Albury. Their relationship became so unworkable that M‘Neile resigned his post in June 1834.

Evangelical Anglican Opposition to Ritualism

There were a number of aspects of Victorian ritualism to which
Anglican Evangelicals took particular exception. Prominent among
them were the doctrine of the real presence in the Eucharist, the
use of wafer bread, mixing water and wine in the chalice during the
service, reservation, adoration, benediction, the eastward position
of the celebrant, and the wearing of vestments including albs,
chasubles and coloured stoles. Priestly absolution, and in partic-
ular making the sign of the cross during it, the use of confessionals
and bowing at the name of Jesus were all also particularly offensive
to Evangelicals …
Scotland (1997).

In October 1834, at the suggestion of a friend, the Revd William Dalton (1801–1880), he was appointed to St Jude's Church, Liverpool. The church, which had been built by subscription expressly for Dalton in 1831, could comfortably hold 1,500 people (it was demolished in 1966). At St Jude's, M‘Neile had "a handsome salary" and "a very large and opulent congregation". Once installed at St Jude's, M‘Neile's eloquence attracted the attention of the Bishop of Chester – John Sumner (1780–1862), later Archbishop of Canterbury – who appointed him as an honorary canon of his cathedral. The next Bishop of Chester, John Graham (1794–1865), also held the important and influential ecclesiastical position of Clerk of the Closet to Queen Victoria. Graham was equally impressed with M‘Neile and possibly used his connections to facilitate the conferral of the Incorporate D.D. upon him in 1860.

Later, at St Paul's, a 2,000 plus seat church specifically built for him and consecrated on 2 March 1848 by John Bird Sumner, then Archbishop of Canterbury elect (it closed in 1974), he enjoyed a large income. Over time, M‘Neile became a rich man and his financial independence meant that he answered to none: "McNeile was a fighter by instinct and a political parson by principle and, supported by a confidence derived from considerable personal wealth, he was his own man."

The impelling force behind [M‘Neile’s] actions and utterances was
two basic propositions, the truth of which he believed in totally. First
that the Roman Catholic Church was the enemy of Christianity and
the Pope the Antichrist. [M‘Neile] had difficulty in bringing himself
even to use the word "religion" when referring to Roman Catholicism.
Thus, in his view, it was the duty of a Christian to oppose the Roman
Church at all times and in all places. Individual Roman Catholics were
not to be persecuted, because, in his view, they were victims of a cruel
deception who needed the love and compassion of Christians to help
them find true religion. Second was his belief that the Roman Catholic
Church was engaged in a political conspiracy. It did not, in his view,
recognise the supremacy of temporal rulers and would, whenever
possible, grasp political power and use it to crush heresy. Any
political concessions to Roman Catholicism had to be opposed because,
in his view, the Roman Church was evil and, to the extent that it
obtained political power and influence, true religion would suffer.

His stipend at St Paul's was £1,000 per annum, more than twelve times that of an average curate. He also received £1,500 per annum in pew rents: "He had a large following, and his capacity to imbue popular prejudice against Roman Catholicism with the dignity of a spiritual crusade gave him enormous and explosive influence on Merseyside."

== Roman Catholicism and the Anglo-Catholics ==
In the simplest terms, the doctrines and the rituals peculiar to the Anglo-Catholics were considered, by Evangelicals such as M‘Neile, to be a blatant violation of the promise that all of the Anglican clergy routinely made: viz., to adhere to the forms of service as specified in the Book of Common Prayer – in particular, to what it demanded and what it disallowed – and to adhere to the "Thirty-Nine Articles of Religion".

For M‘Neile, Roman Catholicism endangered "Britain’s providential mission to defend and propagate reformed Christianity": this "providential mission" was a mission of "nationalism" – a concept "contain[ing] an inherent conviction of objective national superiority" – rather than one of "patriotism" (Wolffe, 1991, pp. 308–309).

The Roman Catholic Relief Act 1829, enacted principally to avert the threat of religious civil war in Ireland, abolished many of the restrictions on Roman Catholics that had operated in the United Kingdom for more than a century. This distressed many Anglicans such as M‘Neile, who were already fighting against the influence of Anglo-Catholics in the Church of England.

"As the Tractarian movement in the Church of England developed, M‘Neile became one of its most zealous opponents and the most conspicuous leader of the evangelical party. In 1840, he published Lectures on the Church of England and in 1846 (the year after John Henry Newman's secession to Rome), The Church and the Churches, in which he maintained with much dialectical skill the evangelical doctrine of the "invisible Church" in opposition to the teaching of Newman and Pusey" (McNeile, 1911, p. 265).

In April 1845, when speaking in the House of Commons on the Maynooth Endowment Bill, Thomas Macaulay characterized M‘Neile as "the most powerful representative of uncompromising Protestant opinion in the country" (McNeile, 1911, p. 265).

== Politician ==
In a political speech in 1834, M‘Neile expressed his opinion on the oft-expressed view that clerics should stand aside from politics: "It was said that ministers of religion should not mingle in politics; but God, when he made the minister, did not unmake the citizen." A "big, impetuous, eloquent Irishman with a marvellously attractive personality and a magnificent voice", he had a considerable influence on the developing religious and political life of Liverpool:

When he came to be Curate-in-charge of St. Jude's in 1834, the Town Council had just decided that the Corporation schools should no longer be opened with prayer, that the Bible should be banished, and a book of Scripture Extracts substituted, taken largely from the Douay [rather than the King James] Version, and that no further religious instruction should be given during schoolhours. McNeile flung himself into the fray, and led the opposition. At a great meeting in the Amphitheatre he boldly appealed for funds to open rival schools, and £3000 was promised on the spot – an amount which in a few days increased to £10,000. A circular to the parents next persuaded them to withdraw their children; and north and south the Corporation schools were left almost empty, while the temporary buildings which the Churchmen had taken were crowded to the doors. New schools began to arise as fast as sites could be found, and the Town Council with its great majority had to own itself defeated by one who was almost a perfect stranger to the city. From that moment his power in municipal life was absolute. No Town Council again dared to dispute his will …

In 1835, M‘Neile entered a long dispute, in which he was eventually successful, with the Liverpool corporation, which had been captured by the Whigs, after the passing of the Municipal Reform Act. A proposal was carried that the elementary schools under the control of the corporation should be secularised by the introduction of what was known as the Irish National System. The threatened withdrawal of the Bible as the basis of denominational religious teaching was met by agitation led by McNeile, who so successfully enlisted public support that before the new system could be introduced every child was provided for in new Church of England schools established by public subscriptions. At the same time, M‘Neile conducted a campaign that gradually reduced the Whig element in the council until it virtually disappeared in 1841. The defeat of the Liberal parliamentary candidates in the general election of 1837, followed by a long period of Conservative predominance in Liverpool politics, was largely due to his influence.

== Orator ==
Contrast between the Orator and Preacher, John Ross Dix

But with all our respect and admiration for Dr. M‘Neile, we do not consider him to be a deep thinker: there is great talent, but little profundity, in his verbal discourses; and, popular as he is, we venture to say that he shines less in the pulpit than on the platform.
[On the platform] he is at home; for, released from those trammels which the clergyman must feel around him in the pulpit, he can give a loose rein to his impetuous temper, and allow his eloquence to take broader and bolder flights.
Who that has seen him on the platform of Exeter Hall, and there witnessed his form dilate, and his eye kindle, as he launched forth the thunderbolts of his eloquent indignation against the Romish Church, will not agree with us in thinking that, great as he is in his church at Liverpool, he is still greater as the orator of the public meeting …

"His eloquence was grave, flowing, emphatic – had a dignity in delivery, a perfection of elocution, that only John Bright equalled in the latter half of the 19th century. Its fire was solemn force. McNeile's voice was probably the finest organ ever heard in public oratory. His action was as graceful as it was expressive". According to one observer, M‘Neile was "the most brilliant and highly-polished compound of natural and artificial advantages which I have ever beheld"; and, "as a specimen of appropriate action, refined oratory, stern, judicious argument, and commanding talent, all combined in one majestic whole, I may say M‘Neile is incomparable and perfectly unique" (Anon, 1838d).

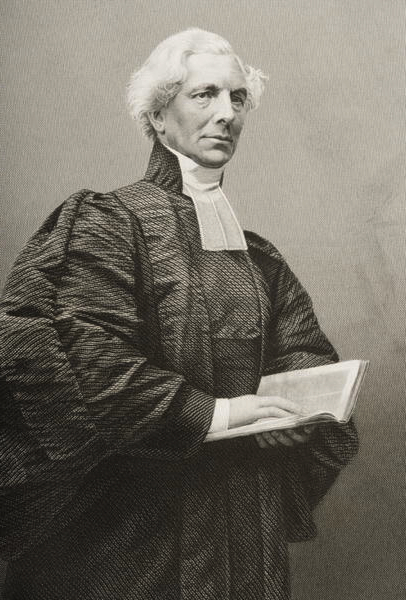
Hugh Boyd M‘Neile (at 65 yrs)

M‘Neile was a tenacious, dogged, relentless, and formidable foe; and, along with his extreme verbal aggression, he was a man of the most imposing physicality. He was at least 6 ft 3 in tall, thick-set, and broad shouldered. He walked with a slight stoop:

He has all the appearance of a man of surpassing muscular power. The very aspect of his countenance bespeaks a person of great mental decision, and of unbounded confidence in his bodily strength. He is just such a person as, were a stranger meeting him in the streets, would be at once set down as a man who could, should ever the occasion arise, distinguish himself in any physical-force exhibition. No footpad would ever think of encountering the reverend gentleman, lest he should come off second best in the scuffle that would be sure to ensue. (Grant, 1841, pp.244–245)

== Preacher ==
We have before had occasion to allude to the extraordinary oratory of Dr. McNeill. He was eloquent beyond even Irish eloquence, Protestant even beyond Irish Protestantism. Several times he has been carried away into confessedly injudicious acts and words, which many would wish unsaid, undone …

There were several extraordinary aspects of his preaching, and of the pulpit from which he preached. Almost without exception, and entirely removed from the firmly established Anglican convention, M‘Neile never preached from notes; and always preached extemporaneously. His sermons routinely lasted 90 minutes; and were never measured, structured appeals to reason – they were outright impassioned histrionic performances intentionally directed at the emotions of his audience:

"I shall never go to hear Mr. M‘Neile again", said a religious friend of ours, returning from St. Jude’s.
"Why not?", we inquired.
"Because", replied he, "if I agree with him, I must come away with feelings of ill-will against parties he has been assailing and who are quite as respectable and intelligent as himself; or, otherwise, I must come away with sentiments of anger towards himself for his intolerance, if I do not agree with him; and I do not choose to go to a place of worship with the liability of leaving it in such an unchristian-like state of mind in either case".

=== M‘Neile's flawed hermeneutics ===
M‘Neile was well known for his flawed hermeneutics; viz., his inaccurate interpretation of Biblical texts. He was renowned for both his inaccurate exegesis, and for his eisegetical projections of Biblical texts onto current events.

For example, in July 1846, Queen Victoria's husband, Prince Albert, visited Liverpool and, among other duties on 31 July 1846, he officially opened the Albert Dock and laid the foundation stone for one of M‘Neile's pet projects, the Liverpool Sailors' Home.

Two days later, on 2 August 1846, M‘Neile preached a sermon, "Every eye shall see Him"; the text of which was immediately published.

Within his sermon – regarded, overall, as a "most melancholy, wretched, and most degrading composition" – M‘Neile moved to speak of "The Prince in all his beauty", mapping Prince Albert's laying of a foundation stone onto a text from Isaiah (33:17) "Thine eyes shall see the King in his beauty"

There were many protests at his equation of "the Saviour of the world" with a "colonel of hussars" and his implicit assertion that Albert held "title-deeds to… divinity" (Anon, 1847h). It was clear his "fearful irreverence" – implying that "an earthly prince" visiting Liverpool had some link to "the awful coming of the Prince of Heaven and Earth to Judgment" – was something that "must be [immediately] apparent to every reverent mind"; and, further, that a "piece of gross and rank blasphemy [was perpetrated] by making the third Person of the Holy Trinity a type of Prince Albert".

=== M‘Neile's immoderate preaching ===
Another extraordinary aspect was his propensity for "[being] carried away into confessedly injudicious acts and words, which many would wish unsaid, undone" (Arnold, 1875, p. 307). On 28 February 1847, he preached that the Irish Famine was an act of God's retribution, punishing the Irish for their collective sins and their tolerance of Roman Catholicism.

On the morning of 8 December 1850, when throwing "thunderbolts" at one of his favourite targets, the evils of the Roman Catholic confessional, M‘Neile made a series of outrageous statements of which, immediately after his sermon had been delivered, he denied any knowledge of ever having uttered; and for which he specifically apologized at the evening service, and withdrew without reservation, as the following newspaper account relates:

The Anti-Popery Agitation – Dr. M‘Neile

The frenzied vehemence of bigotry has reached its climax. At Liverpool, the Rev. Dr. M‘Neile, the notorious platform orator, uttered a sentence last Sunday morning, in the pulpit in St. Paul’s Church, Prince’s Park, which, we are sure, was never surpassed by the cruel ferocity of Popish intolerance, in the worst days of the Inquisition. To be sure, Dr. M‘Neile did not mean it,—he would shudder to be taken at his word; but why does he, a Christian minister, not bridle his tongue, unruly evil that it is? Here is the sentiment, at which Bonner might have blushed, in the bloody reign of persecuting Mary:—

"I would make it a capital offence to administer the confession in this country. Transportation [to the colonies] would not satisfy me; for that would merely transfer the evil from one part of the world to the other. Capital punishment alone would satisfy me. Death alone would prevent the evil. That is my solid conviction."

No, thank God, it is not your solemn conviction, Dr. M‘Neile nor is it the conviction of any English mind, however narrowed by sectarian jealousies, in this age of mild humanity! No bigot, no fanatic, now exists in England, who would, in deed and in fact, erect the gallows or the stake, for the punishment of an erring act of religious custom.
Dr. M‘Neile, on the same Sunday evening, went into his reading desk, and pronounced before his congregation the following apology:—

"In the excitement of an extemporaneous discourse delivered by me this morning, I used, I believe, a most atrocious expression. That expression I have already withdrawn in the sight of God; I have, I trust, made my peace with him; and I now beg to withdraw that expression in the sight of this congregation, and to make my peace with you. I will not repeat the expression which I have referred to; for those who heard it will sufficiently well remember it; whilst I will not grieve (or indict pain upon) those who did not hear it by repeating it."

In 1851, these events were also presented as a classic example of "the dangers of extempore preaching" (Gilbert, 1851, p. 10).

=== M‘Neile's "Satanic Agency and Mesmerism" sermon ===
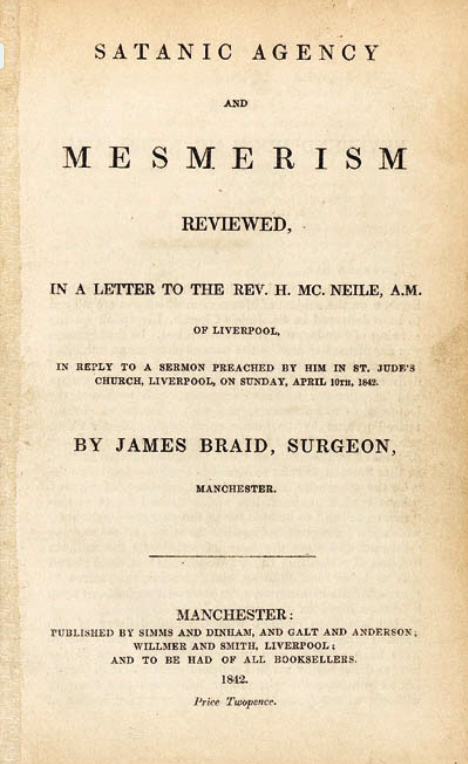
Braid's Satanic Agency and Mesmerism Reviewed (1842)

On the evening of Sunday, 10 April 1842, M‘Neile preached against Mesmerism for more than ninety minutes to a capacity congregation. He began, speaking of "latter days" – following which, Christ would return to Earth, and peace would reign for 1,000 years – and how, as the second advent neared, "satanic agency amongst men" would become ever more obvious; and, then, moving into a confusing admixture of philippic (against James Braid and Charles Lafontaine), and polemic (against animal magnetism), where he concluded that all mesmeric phenomena were due to "satanic agency". The sermon was reported on at some length in the Liverpool Standard, two days later. Once Braid became fully aware of the newspaper reports of the conglomeration of matters that were reportedly raised in M‘Neile's sermon, and the misrepresentations and outright errors of fact that it allegedly contained, as well as the vicious nature of the insults, and the implicit and explicit threats which were levelled against Braid's own personal, spiritual, and professional well-being by M‘Neile, he sent a detailed private letter to M‘Neile accompanied by a newspaper account of a lecture he had delivered on the preceding Wednesday evening (13 April) at Macclesfield, and a cordial invitation (plus a free admission ticket) for M‘Neile to attend Braid's Liverpool lecture, on Thursday, 21 April.

Yet, despite Braid's courtesy, in raising his deeply felt concerns directly to M‘Neile, in private correspondence, M‘Neile did not acknowledge Braid's letter nor did he attend Braid's lecture. Further, in the face of all the evidence Braid had presented, and seemingly, without the slightest correction of its original contents, M‘Neile allowed the entire text of his original sermon, as it had been transcribed by a stenographer (more than 7,500 words), to be published on Wednesday, 4 May 1842. It was this 'most ungentlemanly' act of M‘Neile towards Braid, that forced Braid to publish his own response as a pamphlet; which he did on Saturday, 4 June 1842; a pamphlet which, in Crabtree's opinion is "a work of the greatest significance in the history of hypnotism, and of utmost rarity" (1988, p. 121).

Aside from the newspaper reports of the M'Neile's actual sermon, there were at least twelve published responses to the published version of the sermon and its contents.

== Dean of Ripon ==
M'Neile was in close sympathy with the philanthropic work, as well as the religious views, of the Earl of Shaftesbury, who tried hard to persuade Lord Palmerston to make him a bishop. Although Palmerston usually followed the advice of Shaftesbury in the appointment of bishops, he would not consent to the elevation to the House of Lords of so powerful a political opponent as M'Neile, whom Lord John Russell had accused of frustrating the education policy of the Liberal Party for thirty years.

On 13 August 1868, William Goode, the Dean of Ripon, the senior Anglican cleric in the Diocese of Ripon after the Bishop of Ripon, died suddenly.

On 14 August, Disraeli wrote to Queen Victoria, recommending that the Queen immediately appoint M'Neile to the vacancy, arguing in support of his case that, "at this critical conjuncture [M'Neile] is gaining golden opinions all over England for his eloquent, learned and commanding advocacy of the Royal supremacy …" (Buckle (1926a), p. 533). The Queen's detailed response, written on her behalf by Major General Sir Thomas Myddleton Biddulph, the joint Keeper of the Privy Purse, spoke directly of her reluctance:

Dear Mr. Disraeli, – I am desired by the Queen to reply to your letter of the 14th instant, respecting the appointment of a successor to the late Dr. Goode, Dean of Ripon.

You must be aware how desirous the Queen is generally to sanction the recommendations you make for the disposal of the patronage of the Crown, and that it is most unwillingly her Majesty demurs on the present occasion.
But before sanctioning the appointment of Dr. McNeile to the vacant Deanery, the Queen would wish you to consider well what the effect may be of appointing so strong a partisan to a high dignity in the English Church.
However great Dr. McNeile's attainments may be, and however distinguished he may be as speaker, the Queen believes he has chiefly rendered himself conspicuous by his hostility to the Roman Catholic Church.

The Queen would ask whether his appointment is not likely to stir up a considerable amount of ill-feeling among the Roman Catholics, and in the minds of those who sympathise with them, which will more than counter-balance the advantage to be gained by the promotion of an able advocate of the Royal supremacy. I am, yours faithfully, Thos. Biddulph.

In his response, written on 19 August, Disraeli replied that he had only recommended M‘Neile after the most anxious and deep consideration. Further, and given that he was being subjected to considerable pressure to elevate M‘Neile from a number of quarters (including "the vast number of letters [Disraeli] daily receives on the subject"), he strongly advised the Queen to appoint M‘Neile to the Deanery of Ripon, on the basis that he (Disraeli) had consulted the Lord Chancellor (Hugh Cairns, M‘Neile's nephew by marriage) "on this matter", and that Cairns was "very strongly in favour of the appointment".

He also indicated to the Queen that, in his view, and regardless of her declared reservations, such an appointment was prudent: "the step … would be favourably received by the High Church party [viz., 'faction'], who feel that the claims of Canon McNeile cannot be overlooked"; and, more significantly, he noted that, if he were to be "overlooked" at this time, the pressures might become such that if he were to be "passed over" at this time, he might well gain an even "higher preferment" than the Dean of Ripon.

M‘Neile was hurriedly appointed to the vacancy at Rippon, and was installed on 29 October 1868.

He served in that position until he retired due to ill health on 31 October 1875.

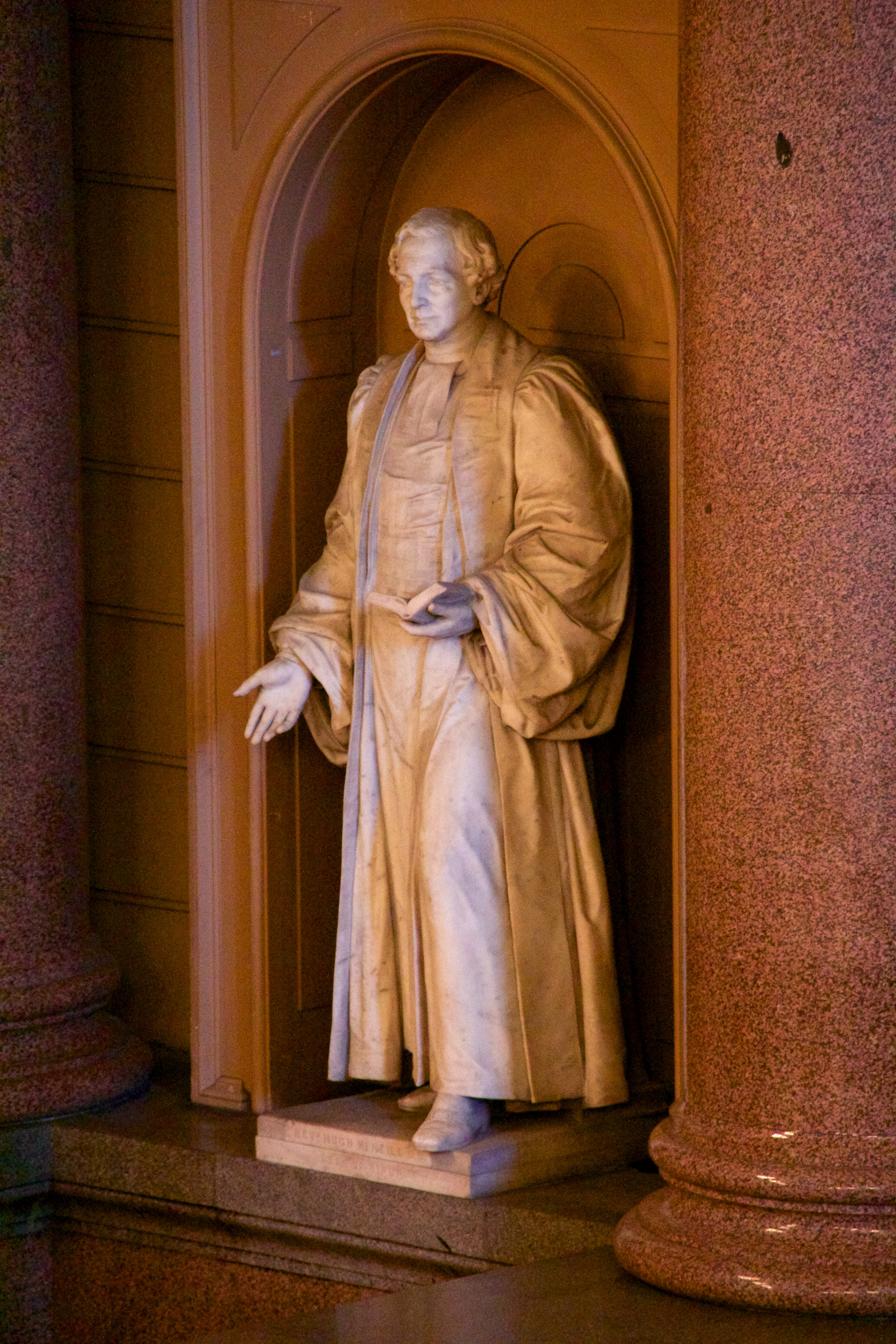
M‘Neile's statue in St Georges Hall

== M‘Neile’s statue ==
Following his installation as the Dean of Ripon (on 29 October 1868), M‘Neile made his last speech in Liverpool on 4 November 1868. A group of his friends and parishioners, "having resolved to erect a full-length marble statue of him in Liverpool, in commemoration of his many valuable and long-continued services in the cause of religion and religious education", announced the next day that they were accepting donations to the Statue Fund, the maximum contributions to which were fixed at £5.

In May the following year, the statue committee announced that its target amount had been reached and that an eminent sculptor, George Gammon Adams, had been commissioned to produce the work and that Adams had already had several sittings with M‘Neile. The statue was carved from a pure white 8-ton block of Italian Carrara marble (the same marble as Michelangelo's David).

Adams took 18 months to finish the 6 ft 9 in (206 cm), 3-ton statue and it was finished in mid-October. On 28 October 1870, the Liverpool Council considered a request from the McNeile Statue Committee "that the statue be accepted for placement in St George’s Hall" (Cavanagh, 1997, p. 281). The suggestion it should place a statue of M‘Neile in such a conspicuous place of honour, "produced an acrimonious discussion"; and, given the fierce objections by a considerable number present, the subject was deferred, for the simple reason that every statue that had been placed in St. George's Hall up to that time had been accepted by a unanimous vote.

At the next meeting, on 9 November 1870, the first chaired by the new Lord Mayor, Joseph Gibbons Livingston (who was a strong supporter of M‘Neile), various motions were put, various amendments were proposed, and a number of very strongly held views were expressed. Despite the convention requiring a unanimous vote, it seems the majority (the final vote was 36 "aye" to 16 "nay") were prepared to take the view that, whatever divisive conduct M‘Neile may have displayed, he deserved recognition as a writer and orator, and agreed to place the statue amongst the other eleven local and national dignitaries (Cavanagh, 1977).

The established Liverpool custom was a public unveiling, with "the most prestigious guest available invited to officiate". These were great popular occasions, wherein "extended eulogies [were] delivered by the succession of committee-members and honoured guests", reports of which were "invariably peppered with the parenthetic "cheers", "hear-hears", "applause" and, even, "loud and extended applause" from crowds that attendant reporters frequently emphasized "encompassed all classes and creeds" (Cavanagh, 1997, p. xvi). Yet, in the case of M‘Neile's statue, it was brought to Liverpool and placed on its pedestal in the dark of night, and was unveiled "without any ceremonial" in St. George's Hall, three days later, on the evening of Monday, 5 December, in the presence of the Mayor, the chairman, secretary, and other several members of the Statue Committee, several "ladies", M‘Neile's son, the Revd Edmund Hugh M‘Neile (who took over St. Paul's, Princes Park from his father) and the Revd Dyson Rycroft, Honorary Canon of Liverpool.

Often, according to the established Liverpool custom, the sculptor would be present; and, on occasion, the sculptor might even deliver a short speech. In the case of M‘Neile's statue, the sculptor was the only one to speak; and, moreover, Adams had to unveil M‘Neile's statue himself.

The final irony is that, of all the statues, "the only statue in St George’s Hall to cause offence because of the character of its subject, is also the only statue to have received unanimous acclaim as a work of art" (Cavanagh, 1997, p. 282):

Mr. G.G. Adams, the artist who has given us the one good statue in St George’s Hall. … People may quarrel with the objects of the promoters of the memorial, but no one can withhold a tribute of admiration to the rare ability of the sculptor. (Liverpool Daily Post, 15 December 1870).

== Death ==
M‘Neile died in Bournemouth on 28 January 1879 after a short illness.

He was interred in the midst of a severe snowstorm at Bournemouth New Cemetery on 1 February 1879. The funeral ceremony was officiated by the Bishop of Peterborough (his nephew, William Connor Magee (1821–1891)), assisted by his son, the Revd Edmund M‘Neile (1840–1893).

Earl Cairns (1810–1885), who was related to M'Neile through his marriage to M'Neile's niece, Mary Harriet M'Neile (1833–1919), and Lord Shaftesbury (1801–1885) were amongst the mourners. Throughout the day the muffled minute bell of Ripon Cathedral was tolled and the cathedral's lectern and pulpit were each covered with a black cloth.
