= Descriptive psychiatry =

Descriptive psychiatry is based on the study of observable symptoms and behavioral phenomena rather than underlying psychodynamic processes. In descriptive psychiatry, the clinical psychiatrist focuses on empirically observable behaviors and conditions, such as words spoken or actions taken.

Modern works sometimes refer to it as biological psychiatry. It was championed by Emil Kraepelin in the early 20th century and is sometimes called Kraepelinian psychiatry. One major work of descriptive psychiatry is the Diagnostic and Statistical Manual of Mental Disorders.

Its focus on observable symptoms contrasts with dynamic psychiatry's emphasis on emotional processes and the mental mechanisms underlying them. The relative popularity of these two basic approaches to psychiatry changes over time. Descriptive psychiatry was seen at its low points as "narrow, bloodless, and without real significance." At its high points, it is considered orderly, systematic, and scientific. Most modern psychiatrists believe that it is most helpful to combine the two complementary approaches in a biopsychosocial model.

== See also ==
- Dynamic psychiatry
