= Johann Joseph Gassner =

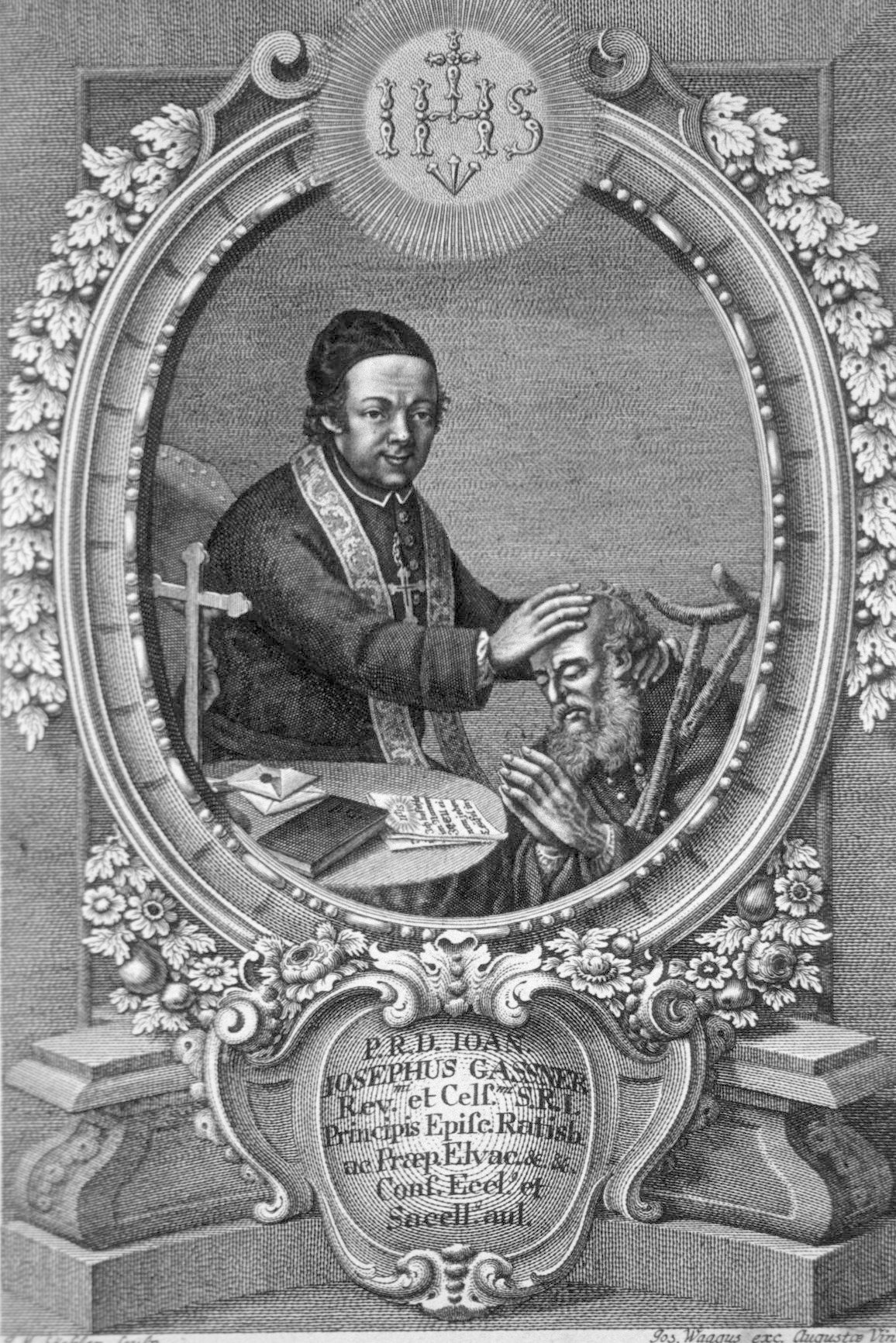
Johann Joseph Gassner

Johann Joseph Gassner (22 August 1727 in Braz, near Bludenz, Vorarlberg – 1779 Pondorf, now part of Winklarn, Bavaria) was a noted exorcist.

While a Catholic priest at Klösterle he gained a wide celebrity by professing to "cast out devils" and to work cures on the sick by means simply of prayer; he was attacked as an impostor, but the bishop of Regensburg, who believed in his honesty, bestowed upon him the cure of Pondorf.

Gassner's methods have been linked to a special form of hypnotic training by Burkhard Peter, who has described them as a predecessor of modern hypnosis. Henri Ellenberger, in his "Discovery of the Unconscious", placed the dispute between Gassner and Franz Mesmer at the center of modern psychotherapy.

== See also ==
- Royal Commission on Animal Magnetism – 1784 French scientific bodies' investigations involving systematic controlled trials
