= Animal magnetism =

Pseudoscientific theory about force in living things

Animal magnetism, also known as mesmerism, is a pseudoscientific theory promoted by German physician Franz Mesmer in the 18th century. It posits the existence of an invisible natural force (Lebensmagnetismus) possessed by all living things, including humans, animals, and vegetables. He claimed that the force could have physical effects, including healing.

The vitalist theory attracted numerous followers in Europe and the United States and was popular into the 19th century. Practitioners were often known as magnetizers rather than mesmerists. It had an important influence in medicine for about 75 years from its beginnings in 1779, and continued to have some influence for another 50 years. Hundreds of books were written on the subject between 1766 and 1925, but it is no longer practiced today except as a form of alternative medicine in some places. This theory also had a strong influence on the development of Kardecism.

== Etymology and definitions ==
=== Magnetizer ===
The terms magnetizer and mesmerizer have been applied to people who study and practice animal magnetism. These terms have been distinguished from mesmerist and magnetist, which are regarded as denoting those who study animal magnetism without being practitioners; and from hypnotist, someone who practises hypnosis.

The etymology of the word magnetizer comes from the French magnétiseur ('practicing the methods of mesmerism'), which in turn is derived from the French verb magnétiser. The term refers to an individual who has the power to manipulate the "magnetic fluid" with effects upon other people present that were regarded as analogous to magnetic effects. This sense of the term is found, for example, in the expression of Antoine Joseph Gorsas: "The magnetizer is the imam of vital energy".

=== Mesmerism ===
A tendency emerged amongst British magnetizers to call their clinical techniques "mesmerism"; they wanted to distance themselves from the theoretical orientation of animal magnetism that was based on the concept of "magnetic fluid". At the time, some magnetizers attempted to channel what they thought was a magnetic "fluid", and sometimes they attempted this with a "laying on of hands". Reported effects included various feelings: intense heat, trembling, trances, and seizures.

Many practitioners took a scientific approach, such as Joseph Philippe François Deleuze (1753–1835), a French physician, anatomist, gynecologist, and physicist. One of his pupils was Théodore Léger (1799–1853), who wrote that the label "mesmerism" was "most improper".

Noting that, by 1846, the term galvanism had been replaced by electricity, Léger wrote that year:

Mesmerism, of all the names proposed [to replace the term animal magnetism], is decidedly the most improper; for, in the first place, no true science has ever been designated by the name of a man, whatever be the claims he could urge in his favor; and secondly, what are the claims of Mesmer for such an honor? He is not the inventor of the practical part of the science, since we can trace the practice of it through the most remote ages; and in that respect, the part which he introduced has been completely abandoned. He proposed for it a theory which is now [viz., 1846] exploded, and which, on account of his errors, has been fatal to our progress. He never spoke of the phenomena which have rehabilitated our cause among scientific men; and since nothing remains to be attributed to Mesmer, either in the practice and theory, or the discoveries that constitute our science, why should it be called mesmerism?

== Royal commission ==
In 1784 two French royal commissions appointed by Louis XVI studied Mesmer's magnetic fluid theory to try to establish it by scientific evidence. The commission of the Academy of Sciences included Majault, Benjamin Franklin, Jean Sylvain Bailly, Jean-Baptiste Le Roy, Sallin, Jean Darcet, de Borey, Joseph-Ignace Guillotin, and Antoine Lavoisier. The commission of the Royal Society of Medicine was composed of Poissonnier, Caille, Mauduyt de la Varenne, Andry, and Antoine Laurent de Jussieu.

Whilst the commission agreed that the cures claimed by Mesmer were indeed cures, it also concluded there was no evidence of the existence of his "magnetic fluid", and that its effects derived from either the imaginations of its subjects or charlatanry.

== Royal Academy investigation ==
A generation later, another investigating committee, appointed by a majority vote in 1826 in The Royal Academy of Medicine in Paris, studied the effects and clinical potentials of the mesmeric procedure, without trying to establish the physical nature of any magnetic fluidum. The report says:

what we have seen in the course of our experiments bears no sort of resemblance to what the Report of 1784 relates with regard to the magnetizers of that period. We neither admit nor reject the existence of the fluid, because we have not verified the fact; we do not speak of the baquet ... nor of the assemblage of a great number of people together, who were magnetized in the presence of a crowd of witnesses; because all our experiments were made in the most complete stillness ... and always upon a single person at a time. We do not speak of ... the crisis.

Among the conclusions were:

Magnetism has taken effect upon persons of different sexes and ages.
... In general, magnetism does not act upon persons in a sound state of health.
... Neither does it act upon all sick persons.
... we may conclude with certainty that this state exists, when it gives rise to the development of new faculties, which have been designated by the names of clairvoyance; intuition; internal prevision; or when it produces great changes in the physical economy, such as insensibility; a sudden and considerable increase of strength; and when these effects cannot be referred to any other cause.
... We can not only act upon the magnetized person, but even place him in a complete state of somnambulism, and bring him out of it without his knowledge, out of his sight, at a certain distance, and with doors intervening.
... The greater number of the somnambulists whom we have seen, were completely insensible ... we might pinch their skin, so as to leave a mark, prick them with pins under the nails, &c. without producing any pain, without even their perceiving it. Finally, we saw one who was insensible to one of the most painful operations in surgery, and who did not manifest the slightest emotion in her countenance, her pulse, or her respiration.
... Magnetism is as intense, and as speedily felt, at a distance of six feet as of six inches; and the phenomena developed are the same in both cases.
...Magnetism ought to be allowed a place within the circle of medical sciences...

== Mesmerism and hypnotism ==
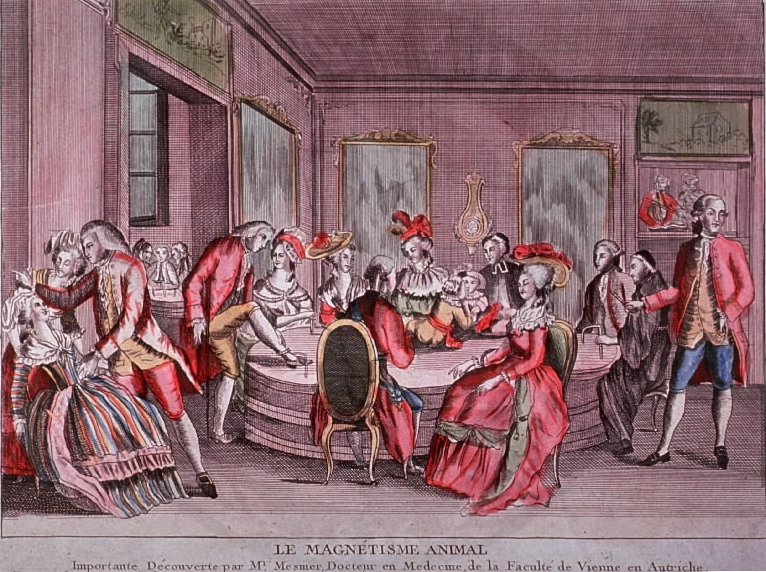
Baquet. Interior view: Drawing room scene with many people sitting and standing around a large table; a man on a crutch has an iron band wrapped around his ankle; others in the group are holding bands similarly; to the left, a man has magnetised a woman. (1780)

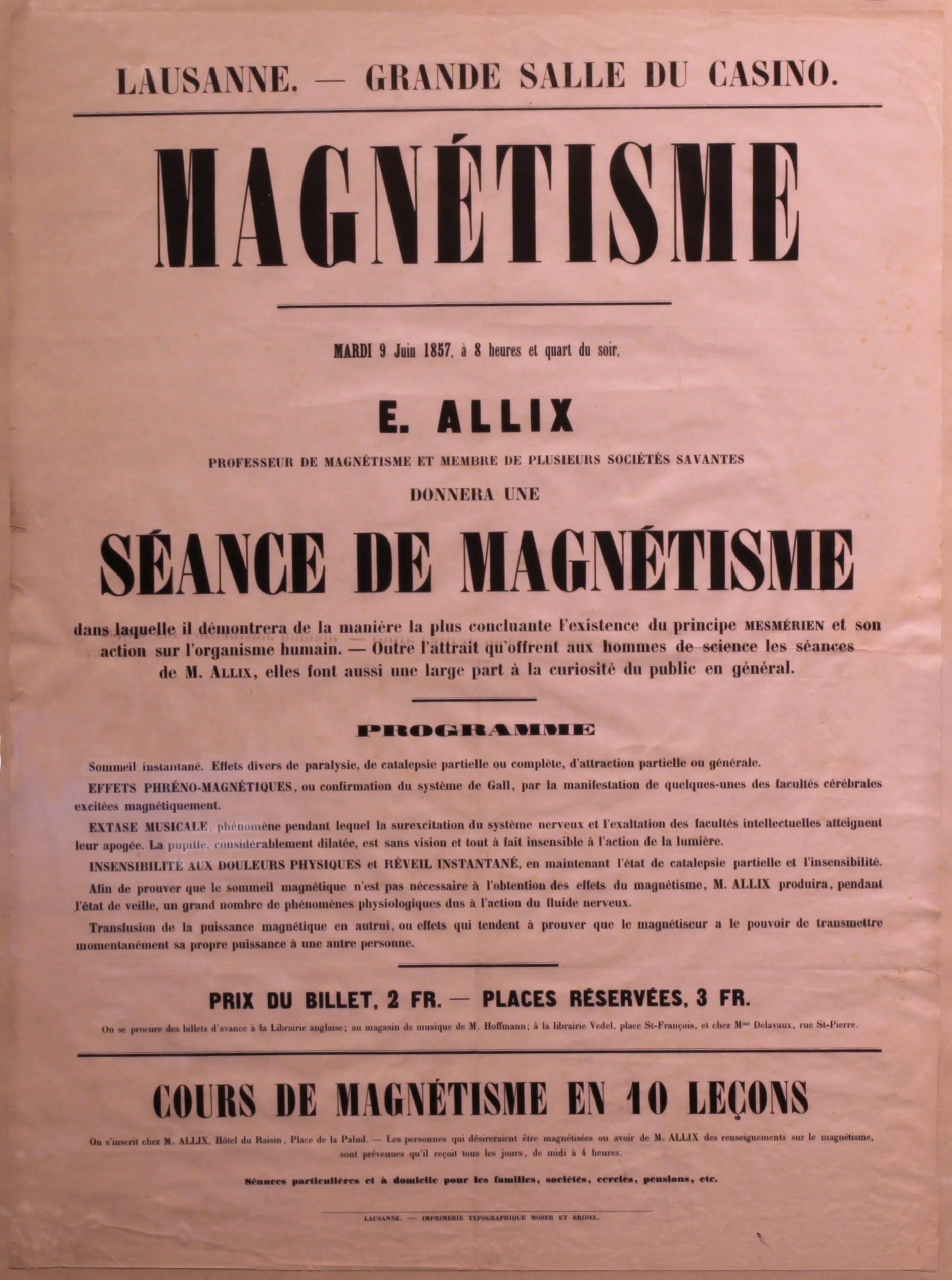
Advertisement poster of 1857: Instant sleep. Miscellaneous effects of paralysis, partial and complete catalepsy, partial or complete attraction. Phreno-magnetic effects (...) Musical ectasy (...) Insensitivity to physical pain and instant awakening (...) transfusion of magnetic power to others

=== Faria and "oriental hypnosis" ===
Abbé Faria was one of the disciples of Franz Anton Mesmer who continued with Mesmer's work following the conclusions of the Royal Commission. In the early 19th century, Abbé Faria is said to have introduced oriental hypnosis to Paris and to have conducted experiments to prove that "no special force was necessary for the production of the mesmeric phenomena such as the trance, but that the determining cause lay within the subject himself"—in other words, that it worked purely by the power of suggestion.

=== Braid and "hypnotism" ===
Hypnotism, a designation coined by the Scottish surgeon, James Braid, originates in Braid's response to an 1841 exhibition of "animal magnetism", by Charles Lafontaine, in Manchester. Writing in 1851, Braid was adamant that, in the absence of the sorts of "higher phenomena" reportedly produced by the mesmerists,

and in contra-distinction to the Transcendental [i.e., metaphysical] Mesmerism of the Mesmerists … [allegedly] induced through the transmission of an occult influence from [the body of the operator to that of the subject,] Hypnotism, [by which] I mean a peculiar condition of the nervous system, into which it can be thrown by artificial contrivance … [a theoretical position that is entirely] consistent with generally admitted principles in physiological and psychological science [would] therefore [be most aptly] designated Rational Mesmerism.

=== "Mesmerism" and "hypnotism" ===
While there is a great range of theories and practices collectively denoted mesmerism, research has clearly identified that there are substantial and significant differences between "mesmerism" and "hypnotism" however they may be defined.

== Vital fluid and animal magnetism ==
A 1791 London publication explains Mesmer's theory of the vital fluid:

Modern philosophy has admitted a plenum or universal principle of fluid matter, which occupies all space; and that as all bodies moving in the world, abound with pores, this fluid matter introduces itself through the interstices and returns backwards and forwards, flowing through one body by the currents which issue therefrom to another, as in a magnet, which produces that phenomenon which we call Animal Magnetism. This fluid consists of fire, air and spirit, and like all other fluids tends to an equilibrium, therefore it is easy to conceive how the efforts which the bodies make towards each other produce animal electricity, which in fact is no more than the effect produced between two bodies, one of which has more motion than the other; a phenomenon serving to prove that the body which has most motion communicates it to the other, until the medium of motion becomes an equilibrium between the two bodies, and then this equality of motion produces animal electricity.

According to an anonymous writer of a series of letters published by editor John Pearson in 1790, animal magnetism can cause a wide range of effects ranging from vomiting to what is termed the "crisis". The purpose of the treatment (inducing the "crisis") was to shock the body into convulsion in order to remove obstructions in the humoral system that were causing sicknesses. Furthermore, this anonymous supporter of the animal magnetism theory purported that the "crisis" created two effects: first, a state in which the "[individual who is] completely reduced under Magnetic influence, although he should seem to be possessed of his senses, yet he ceases to be an accountable creature", and a second "remarkable" state, which would be "conferred upon the [magnetized] subject … [namely] that of perfect and unobstructed vision … in other words, all opacity is removed, and every object becomes luminous and transparent". A patient under crisis was believed to be able to see through the body and find the cause of illness, either in themselves or in other patients.

The Marquis of Puységur's miraculous healing of a young man named Victor in 1784 was attributed to, and used as evidence in support of, this "crisis" treatment. The Marquis was allegedly able to hypnotize Victor and, while hypnotized, Victor was said to have been able to speak articulately and diagnose his own sickness.

Jacob Melo discusses in his books some mechanisms by which the perceived effects of animal magnetism have been claimed to operate.

== Skepticism in the Romantic Era ==
A caricature of Mesmer filmed by George Mèliés, 1905

The study of animal magnetism spurred the creation of the Societies of Harmony in France, where members paid to join and learn the practice of magnetism. Doctor John Bell was a member of the Philosophical Harmonic Society of Paris, and was certified by the society to lecture and teach on animal magnetism in England. The existence of the societies transformed animal magnetism into a secretive art, where its practitioners and lecturers did not reveal the techniques of the practice based on the society members that have paid for instruction, veiling the idea that it was unfair to reveal the practice to others for free. Although the heightened secrecy of the practice contributed to the skepticism about it, many supporters and practitioners of animal magnetism touted the ease and possibility for everyone to acquire the skills to perform its techniques.

Popularization of animal magnetism was denounced and ridiculed by newspaper journals and theatre during the Romantic Era. Many deemed animal magnetism to be nothing more than a theatrical falsity or quackery. In a 1790 publication, an editor presented a series of letters written by an avid supporter of animal magnetism and included his own thoughts in an appendix stating: "No fanatics ever divulged notions more wild and extravagant; no impudent empiric ever retailed promises more preposterous, or histories of cures more devoid of reality, than the tribe of magnetisers".

The novelist and playwright Elizabeth Inchbald wrote the farce Animal Magnetism in the late 1780s. The plot revolved around multiple love triangles and the absurdity of animal magnetism. The following passage mocks the medical prowess of those qualified only as mesmerists:

Doctor: They have refused to grant me a diploma—forbid me to practice as a physician, and all because I don't know a parcel of insignificant words; but exercise my profession according to the rules of reason and nature; Is it not natural to die, then if a dozen or two of my patients have died under my hands, is not that natural? ...

Although the doctor's obsession with the use of animal magnetism, not merely to cure but to force his ward to fall in love with him, made for a humorous storyline, Inchbald's light-hearted play commented on what society perceived as threats posed by the practice.

De Mainanduc brought animal magnetism to England in 1787 and promulgated it into the social arena. In 1785, he had published proposals to the ladies of Britain to establish a "hygean society" or society of health, by which they would pay to join and enjoy his treatments. As both popularity and skepticism increased, many became convinced that animal magnetism could lead to sexual exploitation of women. Not only did the practice involve close personal contact via the waving of hands over the body, but people were concerned that the animal magnetists could hypnotize women and direct them at will.

Having removed all misconceptions, foretelling of the future, explicit or implicit invocation of the devil, the use of animal magnetism is indeed merely an act of making use of physical media that are otherwise licit and hence it is not morally forbidden, provided it does not tend toward an illicit end or toward anything depraved. (The Sacred Congregation of the Holy Office: 28 July 1847.)

== Political influence ==
The French Revolution catalyzed existing internal political friction in Britain in the 1790s; a few political radicals used animal magnetism as more than just a moral threat but also a political threat. Major politicians and people in power were accused by radicals of practising animal magnetism on the general population.

In his article "Under the Influence: Mesmerism in England", Roy Porter notes that James Tilly Matthews suggested that the French were infiltrating England via animal magnetism. Matthews believed that "magnetic spies" would invade England and bring it under subjection by transmitting waves of animal magnetism to subdue the government and people. Such an invasion from foreign influences was perceived as a radical threat.

== Mesmerism and spiritual healing practices ==
During the Romantic period, mesmerism produced enthusiasm and inspired horror in the spiritual and religious context. Though discredited as a medical practice, mesmerism created a venue for spiritual healing. Some animal magnetists advertised their practices by stressing the "spiritual rather than physical benefits to be gained from animal magnetism" and were able to gather a good clientele from among the spiritually inspired population.

Mesmerism has been used in parts of the world as an attempt to treat illness in humans, as well as disease in domestic, farm, circus, and zoo animals.

Some authors including Johann Peter Lange and Allan Kardec claimed that the source of Jesus' miracles was animal magnetism. Others, like John Campbell Colquhoun and Mary Baker Eddy, denounced the comparison. Mary Baker Eddy went so far as to claim animal magnetism "lead[s] to moral and to physical death."

== Professional magnetizers ==
In the Classical era of animal magnetism, the late 17th century to the mid-19th century, there were professional magnetizers, whose techniques were described by authors of the time as particularly effective. Their method was to spend prolonged periods "magnetizing" their customers directly or through "mesmeric magnets". It was observed that in some conditions, certain mesmerizers were more likely to achieve the result than others, regardless of their degree of knowledge.

- Alexandre Jacques François Bertrand
- Richard Chenevix
- Étienne Félix d'Henin de Cuvillers
- Andrew Jackson Davis
- Jules Denis Dupotet de Sennevoy
- Hector Durville
- Adolph Carl August von Eschenmayer
- Abbé Faria
- Charles Foster
- Paul Gibier
- Valentine Greatrakes
- Allan Kardec
- Justinus Kerner
- Charles Lafontaine
- Johann Kaspar Lavater
- Franz Anton Mesmer
- Marquis of Puységur
- Phineas Parkhurst Quimby
- Albert de Rochas
- Alphonse Teste
- Georges Gilles de la Tourette
- Charles de Villers
- Alfred Russel Wallace

== In literature ==
- Ursule Mirouët, an 1841 novel by Honoré de Balzac, features a character who converts to Christianity in part because of an experience with animal magnetism.
- Edgar Allan Poe's 1845 short story "The Facts in the Case of M. Valdemar" is based on the premise that a person could be mesmerised at the moment of death. Poe published the work without explicitly stating that it was fictional, leading some readers to believe it was a true account. In another Poe work, "Some Words with a Mummy", characters are stated to detail facts of phrenology and animal magnetism to an ancient mummy who was revitalized.
- Nathaniel Hawthorne's writings show his curiosity with mesmerism, particularly his 1851 novel The House of the Seven Gables, in which Alice and later Phoebe are apparently mesmerised by members of the Maule family.
- Aldous Huxley's 1962 novel "Island". References Professor John Elliotson and animal magnetism as a way to perform painless surgery without anaesthesia. Mesmerism/Magnestism/Hypnosis are themes running throughout the book. Used primarily as a tool to enhance independent thought within the population.
- Axel Munthe's 1929 book of memoirs "The Story of San Michele". A lightly embellished biography of Dr Axel Munthe and his history around owning Villa San Michele in Ana Capri; with a series of completely unsubstantiated fanciful references to Charcot and mesmerism in chapter XIX, "Hypnotism".
- William Faulkner's 1930 novel "As I Lay Dying" references animal magnetism in a brief chapter in which the character Cash explains his rationale for the design of the wooden coffin he built for his mother Addie.
- Robert Browning's poem "Mesmerism" was published in 1855. It describes the experience of violent passion for a woman. In after years, Ezra Pound wrote a poem of the same name, acknowledging his debt to Browning while gently mocking the poet's obscure style.
- Ambrose Parry's crime novel (under the joint pen-name of authors Christopher Brookmyre and Marisa Haetzman), "Voices of the Dead" (2023) is concerned with Mesmerism in mid-19th century Edinburgh and its impact on the medical establishment of the time.

== See also ==
- Biomagnetism – Magnetic fields produced by organisms
- Caloric theory – Obsolete scientific theory of heat flow
- Charles Lafontaine – 19th-century French showman known for demonstrations of animal magnetism
- James Esdaile – Scottish surgeon
- Magnetoception – Biological ability to perceive magnetic fields
- Odic force – Hypothetical vital energy or life force
- Orenda – Theorized spiritual power
- Royal Commission on Animal Magnetism – 1784 French scientific bodies' investigations involving systematic controlled trials
- The Zoist: A Journal of Cerebral Physiology & Mesmerism, and Their Applications to Human Welfare – Academic journal devoted to pseudoscientific concepts

== Sources ==
- Bailly, Jean-Sylvain (2002). "Secret report on mesmerism or animal magnetism". International Journal of Clinical and Experimental Hypnosis. 50 (4): 364–368. doi:10.1080/00207140208410110. PMID 12362952. S2CID 143420875.
- Barth, George H., The Mesmerist's Manual, London (1851), Reprint, ISBN 978-1532953002.
- Bloch, G., Mesmerism: A Translation of the Original Scientific and Medical Writings of F.A. Mesmer, William Kaufmann, Inc., (Los Altos), 1980.
- Braid, J., Observations on Trance; or, Human Hybernation, John Churchill, (London), 1850.
- Buranelli, V., The Wizard from Vienna: Franz Anton Mesmer, Coward, McCann & Geoghegan., (New York), 1975.
- Carrer, L., Jose Custodio de Faria: Hypnotist, Priest and Revolutionary, Trafford, (Victoria), 2004.
- Chenevix, R., "On Mesmerism, Improperly Denominated Animal Magnetism", London Medical and Physical Journal, Vol.61, No.361, (March 1829), pp. 219–30; No. 364, (June 1829), pp. 491–501; Vol.62, No.366, (August 1829), pp. 114–25; No.367, (September 1829), pp. 210–20; No. 368, (October 1829), pp. 315–24.
- Chester, R.J. (1982), Hypnotism in East and West: Twenty Hypnotic Methods, London, The Octagon Press.
- Colquhoun, John Campbell. Isis Revelata: An Inquiry Into the Origin, Progress, and Present State of Animal Magnetism. Vol. 2. 1836. Reprint. London: Forgotten Books
- Crabtree, Alan (1993). From Mesmer to Freud, Magnetic Sleep and the Roots of Psychological Healing. Yale University Press. ISBN 978-0-300-05588-7.
- Darnton, R., Mesmerism, and the End of the Enlightenment in France, Harvard University Press, (Cambridge), 1968.
- Deleuze, Joseph-Philippe-François, Practical Instruction in Animal Magnetism (1843)
- Donaldson, I.M.L., "Mesmer's 1780 Proposal for a Controlled Trial to Test his Method of Treatment Using 'Animal Magnetism'", Journal of the Royal Society of Medicine, Vol. 98, No. 12, (December 2005), pp. 572–75.
- Edmonston, W.E. (1986), The Induction of Hypnosis, New York: John Wiley & Sons.
- Engledue, W.C., Cerebral Physiology and Materialism, With the Result of the Application of Animal Magnetism to the Cerebral Organs: An Address Delivered to the Phrenological Association in London, June 20th, 1842, by W.C. Engledue, M.D. with a Letter from Dr. Elliotson on Mesmeric Phrenology and Materialism, H. Ballière, (London), 1842.
- Fulford, T., "Conducting the Vital Fluid: The Politics and Poetics of Mesmerism in the 1790s", Studies in Romanticism, Vol. 43, No. 1, (Spring 2004), pp. 57–78.
- Franklin, Benjamin; Majault; Roy, Le; Sallin; Bailly, Jean-Sylvain; d'Arcet; Bory, De; Guillotin, Joseph-Ignace; Lavoisier, Antoine (2002). "Report of the commissioners charged by the king with the examination of animal magnetism". International Journal of Clinical and Experimental Hypnosis. 50 (4): 332–63. doi:10.1080/00207140208410109. PMID 12362951. S2CID 36506710.
- Gauld, A. (1988), "Reflections on Mesmeric Analgesia", British Journal of Experimental and Clinical Hypnosis, (5), 17–24.
- Gauld, Alan (1992). A history of hypnotism. Cambridge University Press. ISBN 978-0-521-48329-2.
- Gibson, H.B., & Heap, M. (1991), Hypnosis in Therapy, Hove: Lawrence Erlbaum Associates.
- Goldsmith, M., Franz Anton Mesmer: A History of Mesmerism, Doubleday, Doran & Co., (New York), 1934.
- Hallaji, Jafar, "Hypnotherapeutic Techniques in a Central Asian Community", International Journal of Experimental and Clinical Hypnosis, Vol. 10, No. 4, (October 1962), pp. 271–74. doi:10.1080/00207146208415886
- Harte, R., Hypnotism and the Doctors, Volume I: Animal Magnetism: Mesmer/De Puysegur, L.N. Fowler & Co., (London), 1902.
- Harte, R., Hypnotism and the Doctors, Volume II: The Second Commission; Dupotet And Lafontaine; The English School; Braid's Hypnotism; Statuvolism; Pathetism; Electro-Biology, L.N. Fowler & Co., (London), 1903.
- Kaplan, F., "'The Mesmeric Mania': The Early Victorians and Animal Magnetism", Journal of the History of Ideas, Vol. 35, No. 4, (October–December 1974), pp. 691–702.
- Kaplan, F., Dickens and Mesmerism: The Hidden Springs of Fiction, Princeton University Press, (Princeton), 1975.
- Kaplan, F., John Elliotson on Mesmerism, Da Capo Press, (New York), 1982.
- Leger, T. [sic], Animal Magnetism; or, Psycodunamy, D. Appleton, (New York), 1846 [N.B. author is Théodore Léger (1799–1853)].
- Lopez, C. A. (1993). "Franklin and Mesmer: An encounter". The Yale Journal of Biology and Medicine. 66 (4): 325–31. PMC 2588895. PMID 8209564.
- MacHovec, F.J., "Hypnosis Before Mesmer", American Journal of Clinical Hypnosis, Vol.17, No. 4, (April 1975), pp. 215–20. doi:10.1080/00029157.1975.10403747
- MacHovec, F.J., "The Cult of Asklipios", American Journal of Clinical Hypnosis, Vol. 22, No. 2, (October 1979), pp. 85–90. doi:10.1080/00029157.1979.10403203
- Mancini, S. & Vale, J., "Animal Magnetism and Psychic Sciences, 1784–1935: The Rediscovery of a Lost Continent", Diogenes, Vol. 48, No. 2, (1 June 2000), pp. 94–101.
- McGarry, J., "Mesmerism vs. Hypnosis: A Comparison of Relaxation Responses and Evaluation of Mental and Psychophysiological Outcomes", Australian Journal of Clinical Hypnotherapy & Hypnosis, Vol. 8, No. 1, (March 1987), pp. 7–36.
- Moore, W., The Mesmerist: The Society Doctor Who Held Victorian London Spellbound, Weidenfeld & Nicolson, (London), 2017. ISBN 978-1-4746-0229-7
- Orsucci, Franco., "Mind force : on human attractions", World Scientific., (London) 2009 ISBN 978-981-277-122-3
- Parssinen, T.M., "Mesmeric Performers", Victorian Studies, Vol. 21, No. 1, (Autumn 1977), pp. 87–104.
- Pattie, F.A., "Mesmer's Medical Dissertation and Its Debt to Mead's De Imperio Solis ac Lunae", Journal of the History of Medicine and Allied Sciences, Vol.11, (July 1956), pp. 275–87.
- Pattie, F.A., Mesmer and Animal Magnetism: A Chapter in the History of Medicine, Edmonston Publishing, (Hamilton), 1994.
- Pearson, John (ed.), A Plain and Rational Account of the Nature and Effects of Animal Magnetism: In a Series of letters. With Notes and an Appendix, W. and J. Stratford, (London), 1790.
- Pintar, Judith; Lynn, Steven J. (2008). Hypnosis: a brief history. John Wiley & Sons. ISBN 978-1-4051-3451-4.
- Podmore, F. (1909), Mesmerism and Christian Science: A Short History of Mental Healing, Philadelphia, PA: George W. Jacobs & Company.
- Porter, R., "'Under the Influence' Mesmerism in England", History Today, Vol. 35, No. 9, (September 1985), pp. 22–29.
- Pulos, L., "Mesmerism Revisited: The Effectiveness of Esdaile's Techniques in the Production of Deep Hypnosis and Total Body Hypnoanaesthesia", American Journal of Clinical Hypnosis, Vol. 22, No. 4, (April 1980), pp. 206–11.
- Rosen, G., "Mesmerism and Surgery: A Strange Chapter in the History of Anesthesia", Journal of the History of Medicine and Allied Sciences, Vol. 1, No. 4, (October 1946), pp. 527–50.
- Sutton, G., "Electric Medicine and Mesmerism", Isis, Vol. 72, No. 3, (September 1981), pp. 375–92.
- van Schlun, Betsy (2007). Science and the imagination: mesmerism, media, and the mind in nineteenth-century English and American literature. Galda & Wilch. ISBN 978-3-931397-60-9.
- Völgyesi, F. (1938). "Eigene Hypnoseversuche mit gefangenen wilden Tieren ['(The author's) hypnotic experiments with captive wild animals']", pp. 90–101 in F. Völgyesi, Menschen- und Tierhypnose ['Human and Animal Hypnosis'], Zürich & Leipzig: Orell Füssli.
- Völgyesi, F.A. (1966), Hypnosis of Man and Animals, London: Baillière, Tindall & Cassell.
- Wilson, J. (1839), Trials of Animal Magnetism on the Brute Creation, London: Sherwood, Gilbert, and Piper.
- Winter, A., Mesmerized: Powers of Mind in Victorian Britain, The University of Chicago Press, (Chicago), 1998.
- Wonders and mysteries of animal magnetism displayed; or the history, art, practice, and progress of that useful science, from its first rise in the city of Paris, to the present time. With several Curious Cases and new Anecdotes of the Principal Professors. Eighteenth Century Collections Online. London (1791)
- Wyckoff, J. [1975], Franz Anton Mesmer: Between God and Devil, Prentice-Hall, (Englewood Cliffs), 1975.
- Yeates, L.B. (2013), James Braid: Surgeon, Gentleman Scientist, and Hypnotist, Ph.D. Dissertation, School of History and Philosophy of Science, Faculty of Arts & Social Sciences, University of New South Wales, January 2013.
- Yeates, L. B. (2018), "James Braid (II): Mesmerism, Braid's Crucial Experiment, and Braid's Discovery of Neuro-Hypnotism", Australian Journal of Clinical Hypnotherapy & Hypnosis, Vol. 40, No. 1 (Autumn 2018), pp. 40–92.
