= Henri Ellenberger =

Canadian psychiatrist

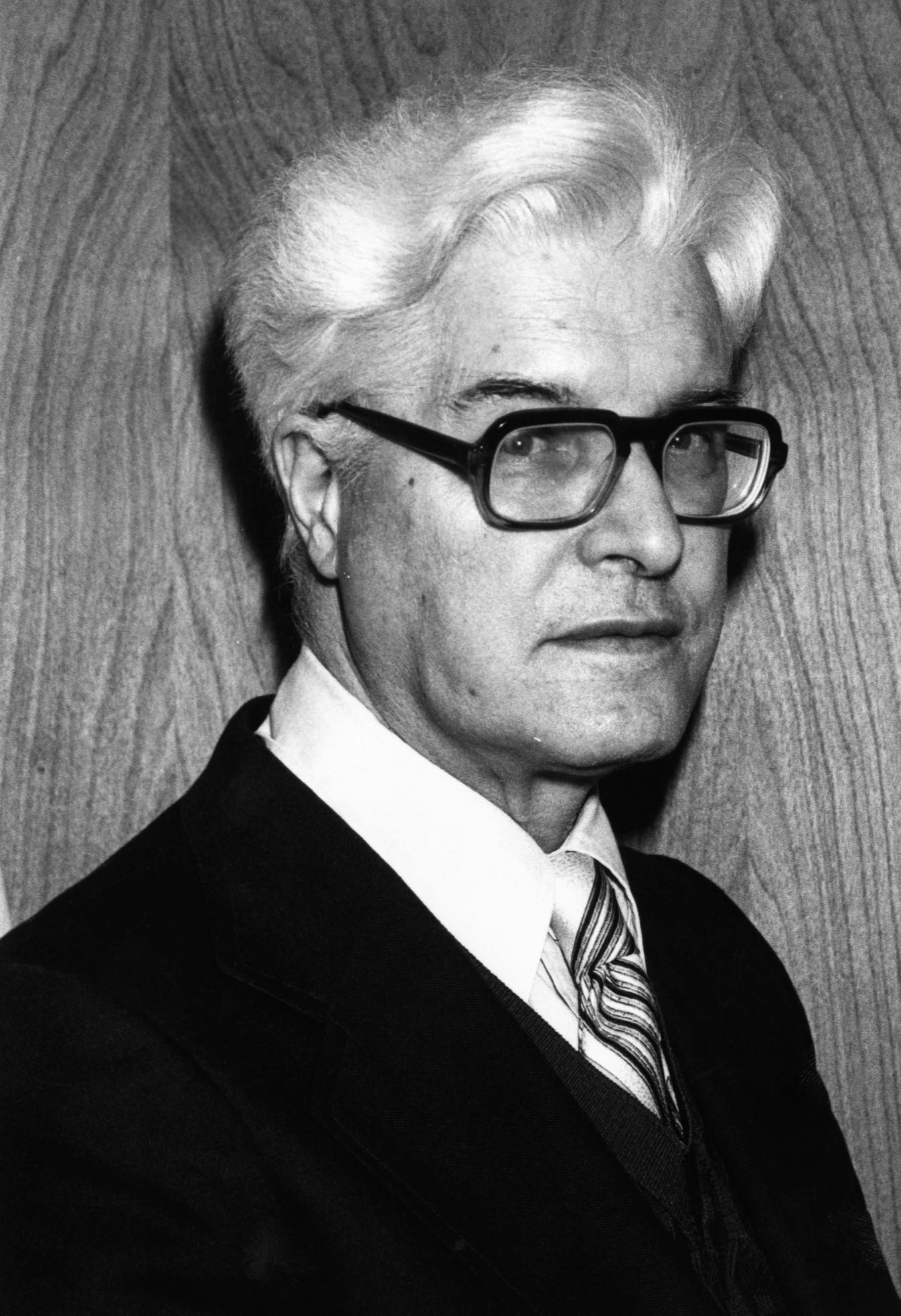
- Born: Henri Frédéric Ellenberger; 6 November 1905; Nalolo, Barotseland, British Rhodesia
- Died: 1 May 1993 (aged 87); Quebec City, Canada
- Occupations: Psychiatrist, medical historian

Henri Frédéric Ellenberger (6 November 1905 – 1 May 1993) was a Swiss-Canadian psychiatrist, medical historian, and criminologist, sometimes considered the founding historiographer of psychiatry. Ellenberger is chiefly remembered for The Discovery of the Unconscious, an encyclopedic study of the history of dynamic psychiatry published in 1970.

== Life ==
Henri F. Ellenberger was born in British Rhodesia to Swiss parents and spent his childhood there. He was later naturalised as a French citizen and took his baccalaureate degree in Strasbourg, France, in 1924.

He studied medicine and psychiatry in Paris. A student of Professor Henri Baruk, he obtained his doctorate in 1934, while working at the Hôpital Sainte-Anne alongside such well-known contemporaries as Jacques Lacan (whose flair for self-publicity he early noted).

Subsequent to the emergence of the Vichy government, Ellenberger immigrated to Switzerland in 1941. There he went through a training analysis with Oskar Pfister between 1949 and 1952, before becoming a member of the Swiss Psychoanalytic Society (SSP).

In 1953, in a major career change, Ellenberger became the lecturer at the Menninger Clinic in Topeka (Kansas). At the end of 1958, Ellenberger left Topeka. He obtained a research appointment in the Division of Social and Transcultural Psychiatry at McGill University in Montreal. In 1962, he became Professor of Criminology at the Université de Montréal, in Canada. There he did pioneering work on victimology, exploring the psychodynamics between offender and victim.

== Publications and awards ==
Ellenberger is chiefly remembered for The Discovery of the Unconscious, an encyclopedic study of the history of dynamic psychiatry published in 1970. This work traced the origins of psychoanalysis and psychotherapy back to its 18th-century prehistory in the attempts to heal disease through exorcism, as practiced by the Catholic priest Johann Joseph Gassner, and from him through the researchers of hypnotism, Franz Mesmer and the Marquis de Puységur, to the 19th century neurologist Jean-Martin Charcot and the main figures of 20th century psychoanalysis Sigmund Freud, Alfred Adler and Carl Gustav Jung.

Robin Skynner praised the clarity of its presentation of the ideas of the great twentieth-century figures in their socio-historical contexts. Ellenberger's account of Pierre Janet has also been singled out for special mention; while Anthony Stevens has made use of his concept of "creative illness" in his account of Jung.

Gay also singled out for mention Ellenberger's 1972 article on Anna O, which Gay considered "persuasively corrects Jones's misreading and Freud's misremembering of the case". It was however only one of the thirty-five or so historical articles Ellenberger published both before and after his great synopsis.

The Resource Center Henri Ellenberger in Paris was named in his honor. During his lifetime he received many awards, including the Gold Medal of the Beccaria Prize in 1970, and the Jason A. Hannah Medal of the Royal Society of Canada.

He also wrote 40 booklets entirely in Esperanto.

== Characterisation ==
Ellenberger has been characterised as one of the mid-century, interdisciplinary independents in psychiatric thought. His unique career path and independent, if moderate, Freudian revisionism, made him at times an isolated figure, especially with the biological turn in psychiatry at the close of the twentieth century. His own belief in the central importance of the reality of the unconscious never faltered, however, even with the fading of his dream of a synthesis that "would do justice to the rigorous demands of experimental psychology and to the psychic realities experienced by the explorers of the unconscious".

From 1956 to 1959, Ellenberger started teaching the history of psychiatry at the Menninger Foundation (where George Devereux already gave a lecture on psychoanalysis and anthropology). The experience of exile played a key role in explaining the Ellenberger's interest in history.

== Works ==
- The Discovery of the Unconscious: The History and Evolution of Dynamic Psychiatry. New York: Basic Books. Hardcover edition: 1970, ISBN 0-465-01672-3. Paperback edition: 1981, ISBN 0-465-01673-1.
- Beyond the Unconscious: Essays of Henri F. Ellenberger in the History of Psychiatry (Princeton 1993) ed. Mark S. Micale
- Doctors of the Soul (1995), ed. Elisabeth Roudinesco
- Rollo May, Ernest Angel, and Henri F. Ellenberger eds., Existence: A New Dimension in Psychiatry and Psychology (1958)
- Henri Ellenberger, "Dynamic Psychiatry: An Introduction. Lecture at the Menninger School of Psychiatry on August 22, 1956, Topeka, Kansas", ed. Emmanuel Delille, Zinbun (Kyoto University 2016), 47, p. 125-128.

== See also ==
- Existential therapy
- Split personality
