= Joseph-Philippe-François Deleuze =

French botanist (1753–1835)

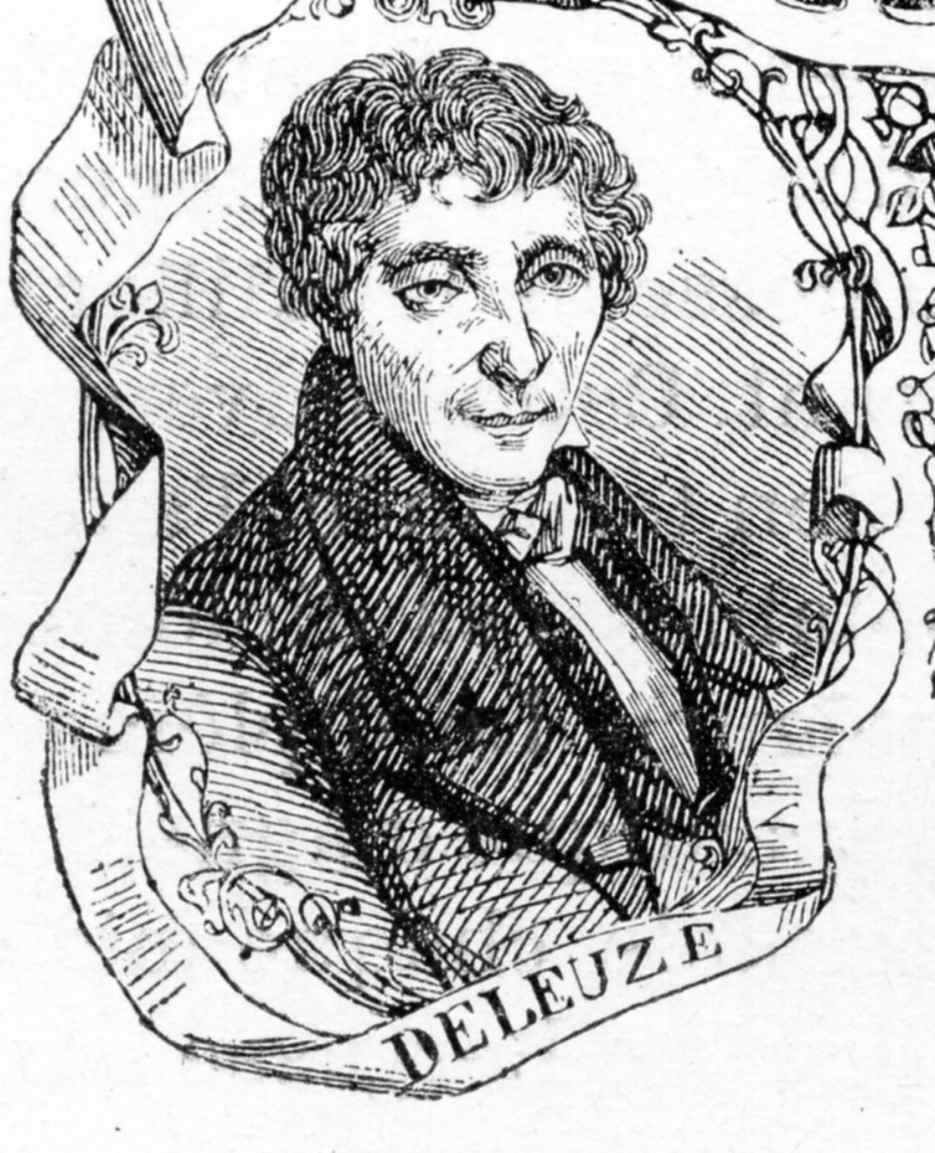
Joseph Philippe François Deleuze

Joseph-Philippe-François Deleuze (French: [dəløz]}; 12 April 1753, Sisteron – 29 October 1835, Paris) was a French naturalist.

== Biography ==
J. P. F. Deleuze studied in Paris and became an assistant naturalist at the National Museum of Natural History in 1795. He collaborated with Antoine Laurent de Jussieu (1748-1836). An assistant naturalist and librarian of the Natural History Museum, he is best known for being a proponent of the theory of animal magnetism and suggested that the French Academy of Sciences study it. Joseph Philippe François Deleuze was a resident member of the Société des observateurs de l'homme. In 1817, Deleuze was elected a member of the American Philosophical Society.

== Honours ==
The genus Leuzea was dedicated to Deleuze by Swiss botanist Augustin Pyrame de Candolle.

The standard author abbreviation Deleuze is used to indicate this person as the author when citing a botanical name.

== Selected publications ==
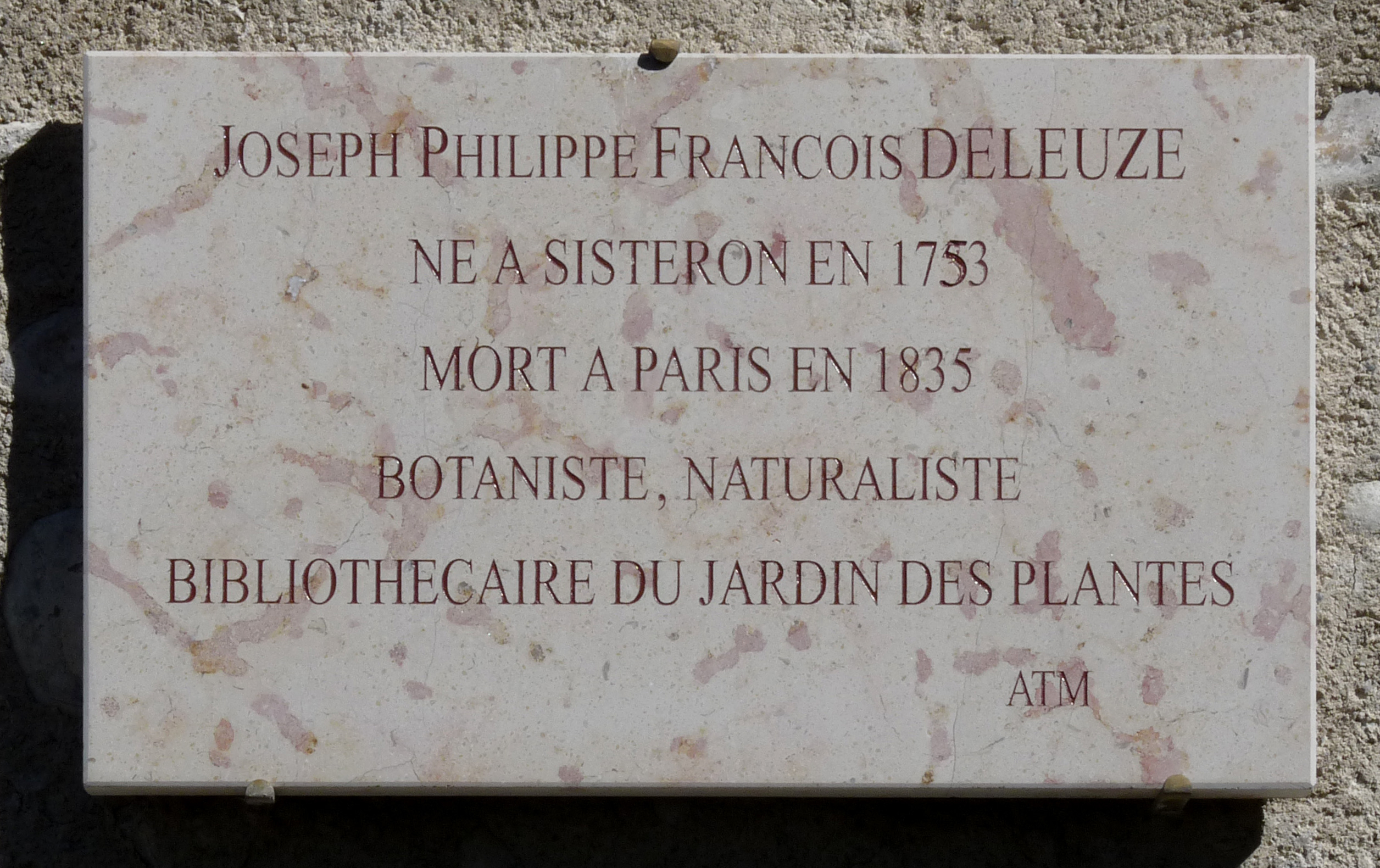
Commemorative plaque, rue Deleuze, in Sisteron.

- 1804: "Notice Historique sur André Michaux" [Historical Notice on André Michaux]. Annales du Muséum National d'Histoire Naturelle [Annals of the National Museum of Natural History]. 3. Paris: National Museum of Natural History: 191–227. ISSN 1256-2599; OCLC 9137885 (all editions); OCLC 1039516294 (all editions).
1. Via Google Books (National Museum of Natural History).
- 1807: Éloge historique de François Péron, included in the Voyage de découvertes aux terres australes, exécuté sur les corvettes le Géographe, le Naturaliste et la goëlette le Casuarina, pendant les années 1800, 1801, 1802, 1803 et 1804, 3 volumes (1807-1816), Impr. impériale (Paris). Troisième volume available at Gallica
- 1813: Histoire critique du magnétisme animal, deux volumes, in-8°, reprinted in 1819, Mame (Paris).
- 1819: Introduction pratique sur le magnétisme animal, suivie d'une lettre écrite à l'auteur par un médecin étranger, reprinted in 1836. J.-G. Dentu (Paris), in-8°, ii + 472 p.
- 1810: Eudoxe, entretiens sur l'étude des sciences, des lettres et de la philosophie, two volumes, in-8°, F. Schoell (Paris).
- 1823: Histoire et description du Muséum royal d'histoire naturelle, A. Royer (Paris) : 720 p. ouvrage available at Gallica
- 1826: Lettre à MM. les membres de l'Académie de médecine, sur la marche qu'il convient de suivre pour fixer l'opinion publique relativement à la réalité du magnétisme animal, Béchet Jeune (Paris) : 39 p. ouvrage available at Gallica

Translations

- 1799: Les Amours des plantes, poème en quatre chants, suivi de notes et de dialogues sur la poésie, ouvrage traduit de l'anglais de Darwin (The Loves of Plants) by Erasmus Darwin (1731-1802).
- 1801: Les Saisons by James Thomson (1700–1748), preceded by a Notice sur la vie et les écrits de Thomson by the translator.
- 1805: "The Annotated Memoirs of the Life and Botanical Travels of André Michaux". Annals of Botany. 1. Originally in French: "Notice Historique Sur André Michaux". Translated by the editors, Charles Konig, FLS (1774–1851) and John Sims, FLS (1749–1831). London: R. Taylor and Co. (Richard Taylor; 1781–1858): 321–355. OCLC 1644096 (all editions) (journal).
1. Via HathiTrust (Harvard).
2. Via Internet Archive (Harvard).
3. Via Google Books (Michigan).

== Bibliography ==
- Féraud, Jean-Joseph-Maxime (1810–1897) [in French] (1850). "Deleuze (Joseph-Philippe-François)". Biographie des hommes remarquables des Basses-Alpes, ou Dictionnaire historique des tous les personnages de ce département qui se sont signalés par leur génie, leurs talents, leurs travaux, la sainteté de leur vie, leurs vertus, ou leurs actes de bienfaisance, depuis les temps les plus reculés jusqu'à nos jours [Biography of Remarkable Men of the Basses-Alpes, or Historical Dictionary of All the People of This Department Who Have Distinguished Themselves by Their Genius, Their Talents, Their Works, the Holiness of Their Life, Their Virtues, or Their Acts of Charity, From the Most Remote Times to the Present Day]. Digne: Étienne Repos, Publisher, Printer-Bookseller. pp. 89–90. OCLC 260055929, 253194728, 457892926, and 27410647.
1. Via Google Books (Bavarian State Library).
- Philippe Jaussaud et Edouard-Raoul Brygoo, Du jardin au Muséum : en 516 biographies, Publications scientifiques du Muséum national d'histoire naturelle, Paris, 2004, 630 p. (ISBN 2-85653-565-8)
- Kremer-Marietti, Angèle [in French] (2005). "Les Entretiens de Joseph-Philippe-François Deleuze" [The Conversations of Joseph-Philippe-François Deleuze]. Épistémologiques, philosophiques, anthropologiques (in French). Paris: L'Harmattan. pp. 201 and following. LCCN 2005-397072; ISBN 978-2-7475-7805-9, 2-7475-7805-4; ISBN 978-2-2963-8691-4, 2-2963-8691-1; OCLC 57637024 (all editions).
1. Via Google Books (very limited preview).
The book is divided into three dialectical parts or main moments of an investigation which takes the epistemological point of view on philosophy.
