= Franz Mesmer =

German physician (1734–1815)

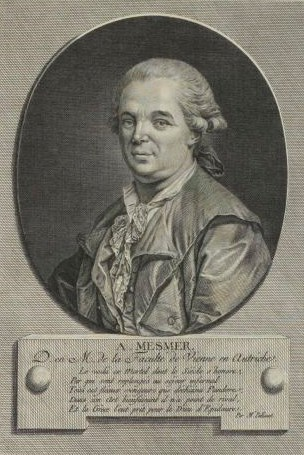
- Print of Franz Anton Mesmer (Musée de la Révolution française)
- Born: Franz Anton Mesmer; 23 May 1734; Iznang, Bishopric of Constance (now Moos, Baden-Württemberg)
- Died: 5 March 1815 (aged 80); Meersburg, Baden
- Education: University of Vienna
- Known for: Animal magnetism

Franz Anton Mesmer (/ˈmɛzmər/ MEZ-mər; German: [ˈmɛsmɐ]; 23 May 1734 – 5 March 1815) was a German physician with an interest in astronomy. He theorized the existence of a process of natural energy transference occurring between all animate and inanimate objects; this he called "animal magnetism", later referred to as mesmerism. Mesmer's theory attracted a wide following between about 1780 and 1850, and continued to have some influence until the end of the 19th century. In 1843, the Scottish doctor James Braid proposed the term "hypnotism" for a technique derived from animal magnetism; today the word "mesmerism" generally functions as a synonym of "hypnosis". Mesmer also supported the arts, specifically music; he was on friendly terms with Haydn and Mozart.

== Early life ==
Mesmer was born in the village of Iznang (now part of the municipality of Moos), on the shore of Lake Constance in Swabia. He was a son of master forester Anton Mesmer (1701–after 1747) and his wife, Maria Ursula (née Michel; 1701–1770). After studying at the Jesuit universities of Dillingen and Ingolstadt, he took up the study of medicine at the University of Vienna in 1759. In 1766 he published a doctoral dissertation with the Latin title De planetarum influxu in corpus humanum (On the Influence of the Planets on the Human Body), in which he discussed the influence of the moon and the planets on the human body and disease.

Building largely on Isaac Newton's theory of the tides, Mesmer expounded on certain tides in the human body that might be accounted for by the movements of the sun and moon. Evidence assembled by Frank A. Pattie suggests that Mesmer plagiarized most of his dissertation from other works, including De imperio solis ac lunae in corpora humana et morbis inde oriundis (1704) by Richard Mead, an eminent English physician and Newton's friend. However, in Mesmer's day doctoral theses were not expected to be original.

In January 1768, Mesmer married Anna Maria von Posch, a wealthy widow, and established himself as a doctor in Vienna. In the summers he lived on a splendid estate and became a patron of the arts. In 1768, when court intrigue prevented the performance of La finta semplice (K. 51), for which the twelve-year-old Wolfgang Amadeus Mozart had composed 500 pages of music, Mesmer is said to have arranged a performance in his garden of Mozart's Bastien und Bastienne (K. 50), a one-act opera, although Mozart's biographer Nissen found no proof that this performance actually took place. Mozart later immortalized his former patron by including a comedic reference to Mesmer in his opera Così fan tutte.

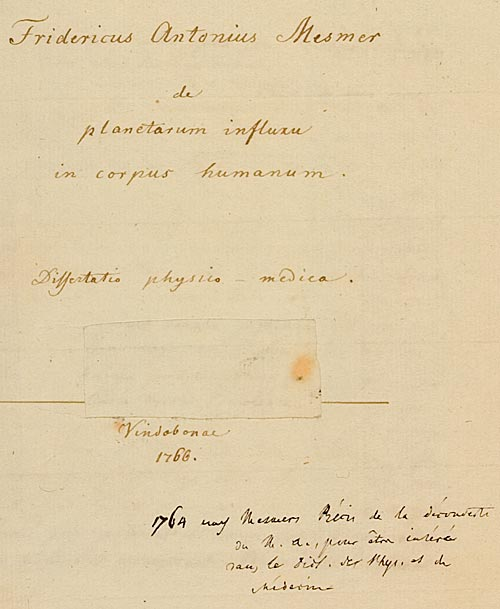
De planetarum influxu in corpus humanum

== Animal magnetism ==
In 1774, Mesmer produced an "artificial tide" in a patient, Francisca Österlin, who suffered from hysteria, by having her swallow a preparation containing iron and then attaching magnets to various parts of her body. She reported feeling streams of a mysterious fluid running through her body and was relieved of her symptoms for several hours. Mesmer did not believe that the magnets had achieved the cure on their own. He felt that he had contributed animal magnetism, which had accumulated in his work, to her. He soon stopped using magnets as a part of his treatment.

In the same year Mesmer collaborated with Maximilian Hell.

In 1775, Mesmer was invited to give his opinion before the Munich Academy of Sciences on the exorcisms carried out by Johann Joseph Gassner (Gaßner), a priest and healer who grew up in Vorarlberg, Austria. Mesmer said that while Gassner was sincere in his beliefs, his cures resulted because he possessed a high degree of animal magnetism. This confrontation between Mesmer's secular ideas and Gassner's religious beliefs marked the end of Gassner's career and, according to Henri Ellenberger, the emergence of dynamic psychiatry.

The scandal that followed Mesmer's only partial success in curing the blindness of an 18-year-old musician, Maria Theresia Paradis, led him to leave Vienna in 1777. In February 1778, Mesmer moved to Paris, rented an apartment in a part of the city preferred by the wealthy and powerful, and established a medical practice. There he would reunite with Mozart, who often visited him. Paris soon divided into those who thought he was a charlatan who had been forced to flee from Vienna and those who thought he had made a great discovery.

In his first years in Paris, Mesmer tried and failed to get either the Royal Academy of Sciences or the Royal Society of Medicine to provide official approval for his doctrines. He found only one physician of high professional and social standing, Charles d'Eslon, to become a disciple. In 1779, with d'Eslon's encouragement, Mesmer wrote an 88-page book, Mémoire sur la découverte du magnétisme animal, to which he appended his famous 27 Propositions. These propositions outlined his theory at that time. Some contemporary scholars equate Mesmer's animal magnetism with the qi (chi) of Traditional Chinese Medicine and mesmerism with medical Qigong practices.

According to d'Eslon, Mesmer understood health as the free flow of the process of life through thousands of channels in our bodies. Illness was caused by obstacles to this flow. Overcoming these obstacles and restoring flow produced crises, which restored health. When Nature failed to do this spontaneously, contact with a conductor of animal magnetism was a necessary and sufficient remedy. Mesmer aimed to aid or provoke the efforts of Nature. To cure an insane person, for example, involved causing a fit of madness. The advantage of magnetism involved accelerating such crises without danger.

=== Procedure ===
Mesmer treated patients both individually and in groups. With individuals he would sit in front of his patient with his knees touching the patient's knees, pressing the patient's thumbs in his hands, looking fixedly into the patient's eyes. Mesmer made "passes", moving his hands from the patient's shoulders down along their arms. He then pressed his fingers on the patient's hypochondrium (the area below the diaphragm), sometimes holding his hands there for hours. Many patients felt peculiar sensations or had convulsions that were regarded as crises and were supposed to bring about the cure. Mesmer would often conclude his treatments by playing some music on a glass harmonica.

By 1780, Mesmer had more patients than he could treat individually, and he established a collective treatment known as the "baquet." An English doctor who observed Mesmer described the treatment as follows:

A caricature of Mesmer "baquet" filmed by Georges Méliès, 1905

In the middle of the room is placed a vessel of about a foot and a half high which is called here a "baquet". It is so large that twenty people can easily sit round it; near the edge of the lid which covers it, there are holes pierced corresponding to the number of persons who are to surround it; into these holes are introduced iron rods, bent at right angles outwards, and of different heights, so as to answer to the part of the body to which they are to be applied. Besides these rods, there is a rope which communicates between the baquet and one of the patients, and from him is carried to another, and so on the whole round. The most sensible effects are produced on the approach of Mesmer, who is said to convey the fluid by certain motions of his hands or eyes, without touching the person. I have talked with several who have witnessed these effects, who have convulsions occasioned and removed by a movement of the hand...

=== Investigation ===
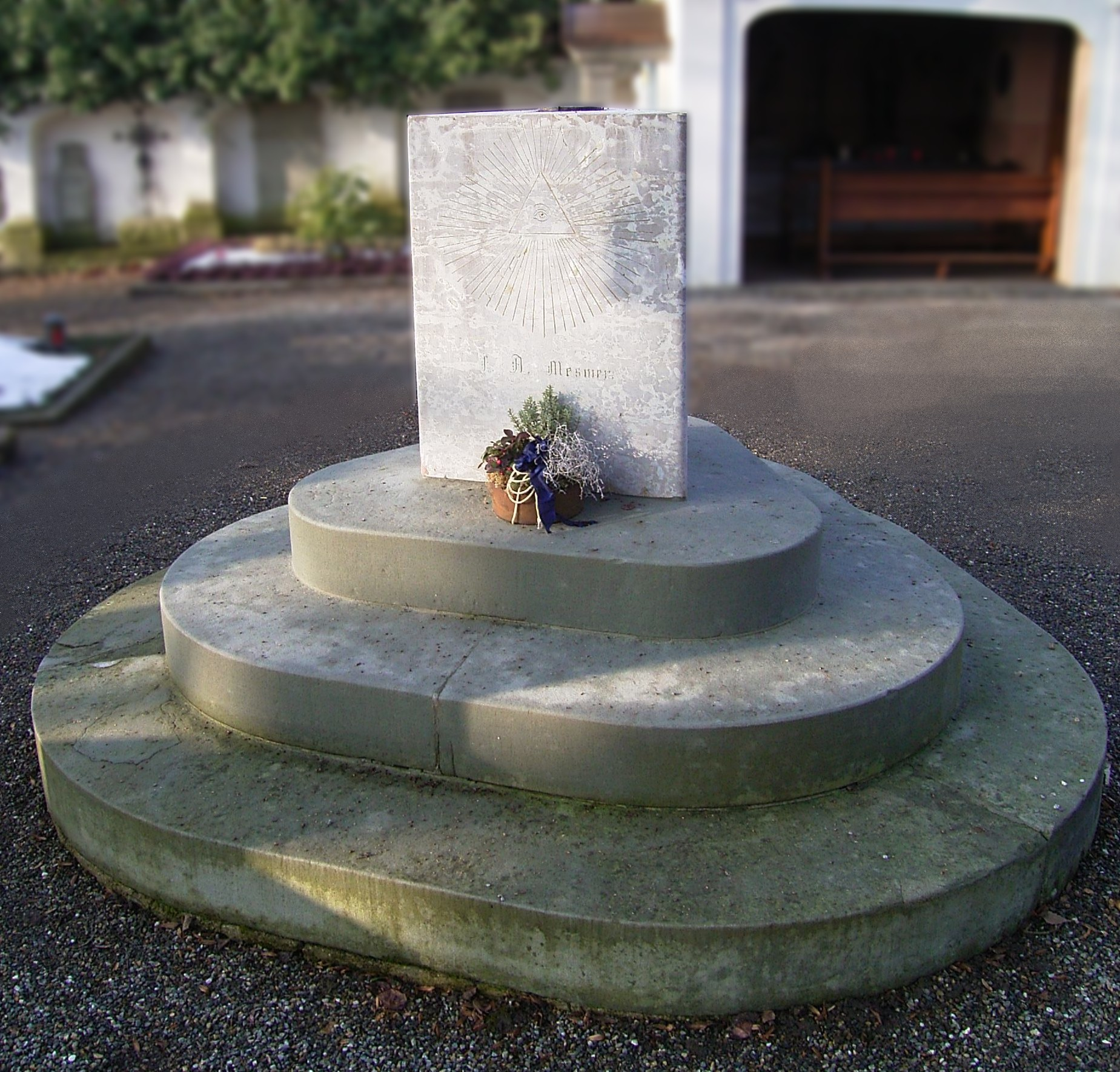
Mesmer's grave in the cemetery in Meersburg, Germany.

In 1784, without Mesmer having requested it, King Louis XVI appointed four members of the Faculty of Medicine as commissioners to investigate animal magnetism and Mesmerism. At the request of these commissioners, the king appointed Baron de Breteuil, minister of the Department of Paris, to establish investigative commissions. One was composed of individuals from the Royal Academy of Sciences, and the other of individuals from the Academy of Sciences and the Faculty of Medicine. The investigative teams included the chemist Antoine Lavoisier, the doctor Joseph-Ignace Guillotin, the astronomer Jean Sylvain Bailly, and the American ambassador Benjamin Franklin.

The commission conducted a series of experiments aimed not just at determining whether Mesmer's treatment worked, but whether he had discovered a new physical fluid. The commission concluded that there was no evidence for such a fluid. Whatever benefit the treatment produced was attributed to "imagination". One of the commissioners, the botanist Antoine Laurent de Jussieu took exception to the official reports, authoring a dissenting opinion.

The commission did not examine Mesmer specifically, but instead observed the practice of d'Eslon. They used blind trials, blindfolding the subjects, in their investigation, and found that Mesmerism seemed to work only when the subject was aware of it. Their findings are considered the first observation of the placebo effect. Even d'Eslon himself was convinced by the commission, stating that, "the imagination thus directed to the relief of suffering humanity would be a most valuable means in the hands of the medical profession."

Mesmer was driven into exile soon after the investigations on animal magnetism. However, his influential student, Amand-Marie-Jacques de Chastenet, Marquis of Puységur (1751–1825), continued to have many followers until his death.

Mesmer continued to practice in Frauenfeld, Switzerland, for a number of years. He died in 1815 in Meersburg, Germany.

== Works ==
- De planetarum influxu in corpus humanum (Über den Einfluss der Gestirne auf den menschlichen Körper) [The Influence of the Planets on the Human Body] (1766) (in Latin).
- Mémoire sur la découverte du magnetisme animal, Didot, Genf und Paris (1779) (in French). View at Gallica, from the Bibliothèque nationale de France (BnF).
- Sendschreiben an einen auswärtigen Arzt über die Magnetkur [Circulatory letter to an external[?] physician about the magnetic cure] (1775) (in German).
- Mémoire sur la découverte du magnétisme animal (1779)
- Précis historique des faits relatifs au magnétisme animal (1781)
- Théorie du monde et des êtres organisés suivant les principes de M…., Paris, (1784) (in French). View at Gallica, BnF.
- Aphorismes de M. Mesmer (1785)
- Mémoire de F. A. Mesmer,...sur ses découvertes (1798–1799) (in French). View at Gallica, BnF.
- Mesmerismus oder System der Wechselwirkungen. Theorie und Anwendung des thierischen Magnetismus als die allgemeine Heilkunde zur Erhaltung des Menschen [Mesmerism or the system of inter-relations. Theory and applications of animal magnetism as general medicine for the preservation of man]. Edited by Karl Christian Wolfart. Nikolai, Berlin (1814) (in German). View at Munich Digitization Center, from the Bavarian State Library.

== Dramatic portrayals ==
In Mozart's 1790 opera buffa Così fan tutte, a humorous scam involves the "Albanian" visitors staging a suicide attempt with poison, so "Doctor" Despina can demonstrate a piece of "Mesmer's magnet" as a miracle cure.

In Gregory Ratoff's 1949 film Black Magic, Mesmer was portrayed by Charles Goldner. In Roger Spottiswoode's Mesmer (1994), he was portrayed by Alan Rickman.

== See also ==
- Animal magnetism – Pseudoscientific theory about force in living things
- Royal Commission on Animal Magnetism – 1784 French scientific bodies' investigations involving systematic controlled trials
- Vis medicatrix naturae – Latin phrase affirming the body's self-healing nature
- Vitalism – Belief about living organisms
