= Dynamic psychiatry =

Study of emotional processes

Dynamic psychiatry is based on the study of emotional processes, their origins, and the mental mechanisms underlying them. It is in direct contrast with descriptive psychiatry, which is based on the study of observable symptoms and behavioral phenomena rather than underlying psychodynamic processes. Most modern psychiatrists believe that it is most helpful to combine the two approaches in a biopsychosocial model.

Schopenhauer is an ancestor of modern dynamic psychiatry.

== See also ==
- Descriptive psychiatry
