= History of alternative medicine =

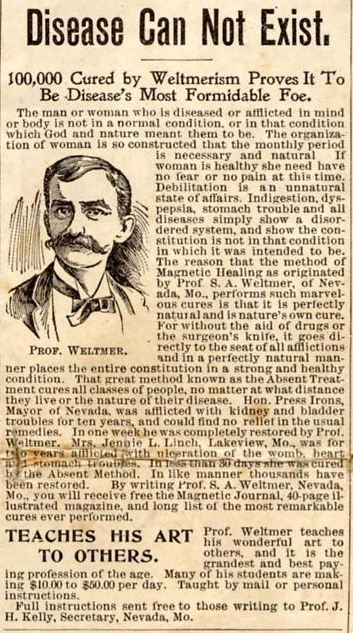
"Disease Can Not Exist", October 1899 advertisement in the People's Home Journal for Weltmerism, a form of "magnetic healing"

The history of alternative medicine covers the history of a group of diverse medical practices that were collectively promoted as "alternative medicine" beginning in the 1970s, to the collection of individual histories of members of that group, or to the history of western medical practices that were labeled "irregular practices" by the western medical establishment. It includes the histories of complementary medicine and of integrative medicine. "Alternative medicine" is a loosely defined and very diverse set of products, practices, and theories that are perceived by its users to have the healing effects of medicine, but do not originate from evidence gathered using the scientific method, are not part of biomedicine, or are contradicted by scientific evidence or established science. "Biomedicine" is that part of medical science that applies principles of anatomy, physics, chemistry, biology, physiology, and other natural sciences to clinical practice, using scientific methods to establish the effectiveness of that practice.

Much of what is now categorized as alternative medicine was developed as independent, complete medical systems, was developed long before biomedicine and use of scientific methods, and was developed in relatively isolated regions of the world where there was little or no medical contact with pre-scientific western medicine, or with each other's systems. Examples are traditional Chinese medicine, European humoral theory and the Ayurvedic medicine of India. Other alternative medicine practices, such as homeopathy, were developed in western Europe and in opposition to western medicine, at a time when western medicine was based on unscientific theories that were dogmatically imposed by western religious authorities. Homeopathy was developed prior to discovery of the basic principles of chemistry, which proved homeopathic remedies contained nothing but water. But homeopathy, with its remedies made of water, was harmless compared to the unscientific and dangerous orthodox western medicine practiced at that time, which included use of toxins and draining of blood, often resulting in permanent disfigurement or death. Other alternative practices such as chiropractic and osteopathy, were developed in the United States at a time that western medicine was beginning to incorporate scientific methods and theories, but the biomedical model was not yet fully established. Practices such as chiropractic and osteopathy, each considered to be irregular by the medical establishment, also opposed each other, both rhetorically and politically with licensing legislation. Osteopathic practitioners added the courses and training of biomedicine to their licensing, and licensed Doctor of Osteopathic Medicine holders began diminishing use of the unscientific origins of the field, and without the original practices and theories, osteopathic medicine in the United States is now considered the same as biomedicine.

Until the 1970s, western practitioners that were not part of the medical establishment were referred to "irregular practitioners", and were dismissed by the medical establishment as unscientific or quackery. Irregular practice became increasingly marginalized as quackery and fraud, as western medicine increasingly incorporated scientific methods and discoveries, and had a corresponding increase in success of its treatments. In the 1970s, irregular practices were grouped with traditional practices of nonwestern cultures and with other unproven or disproven practices that were not part of biomedicine, with the group promoted as being "alternative medicine". Following the counterculture movement of the 1960s, misleading marketing campaigns promoting "alternative medicine" as being an effective "alternative" to biomedicine, and with changing social attitudes about not using chemicals, challenging the establishment and authority of any kind, sensitivity to giving equal measure to values and beliefs of other cultures and their practices through cultural relativism, adding postmodernism and deconstructivism to ways of thinking about science and its deficiencies, and with growing frustration and desperation by patients about limitations and side effects of evidence-based medicine, use of alternative medicine in the west began to rise, then had explosive growth beginning in the 1990s, when senior level political figures began promoting alternative medicine, and began diverting government medical research funds into research of alternative, complementary, and integrative medicine.

== Alternative medicine ==
The concept of alternative medicine is problematic as it cannot exist autonomously as an object of study in its own right but must always be defined in relation to a non-static and transient medical orthodoxy. It also divides medicine into two realms, a medical mainstream and fringe, which, in privileging orthodoxy, presents difficulties in constructing an historical analysis independent of the often biased and polemical views of regular medical practitioners. The description of non-conventional medicine as alternative reinforces both its marginality and the centrality of official medicine. Although more neutral than either pejorative or promotional designations such as "quackery" or "natural medicine", cognate terms like "unconventional", "heterodox", "unofficial", "irregular", "folk", "popular", "marginal", "complementary", "integrative" or "unorthodox" define their object against the standard of conventional biomedicine, entail particular perspectives and judgements, often carry moral overtones, and can be inaccurate. Conventional medical practitioners in the West have, since the nineteenth century, used some of these and similar terms as a means of defining the boundary of "legitimate" medicine, marking the division between that which is scientific and that which is not. The definition of mainstream medicine, generally understood to refer to a system of licensed medicine which enjoys state and legal protection in a jurisdiction, (Note: A more exhaustive definition of conventional medicine in contemporary western societies states that it "enjoys the approval, co-operation, and protection of the country's legal system and other supporting social institutions: government licensing and regulatory boards, third party payment systems, preferred access to federal and private research moneys, high prestige and social status, and their concomitant benefits, including professional associations with considerable lobbying power and professional associations with considerable reputations for authority.") is also highly specific to time and place. In countries such as India and China traditional systems of medicine, in conjunction with Western biomedical science, may be considered conventional and mainstream. The shifting nature of these terms is underlined by recent efforts to demarcate between alternative treatments on the basis of efficacy and safety and to amalgamate those therapies with scientifically adjudged value into complementary medicine as a pluralistic adjunct to conventional practice. (Note: This position has been argued by medical commentators such as Marcia Angell and Jerome Kassirer: "It is time for the scientific community to stop giving alternative medicine a free ride. There cannot be two kinds of medicine – conventional and alternative. There is only medicine that has been adequately tested and medicine that has not, medicine that works and medicine that may or may not work. Once a treatment has been tested rigorously, it no longer matters whether it was considered alternative at the outset. If it is found to be reasonably safe and effective, it will be accepted. But assertions, speculation, and testimonials do not substitute for evidence. Alternative treatments should be subjected to scientific testing no less rigorous than that required for conventional treatments.") This would introduce a new line of division based upon medical validity.

== Before the "fringe" ==
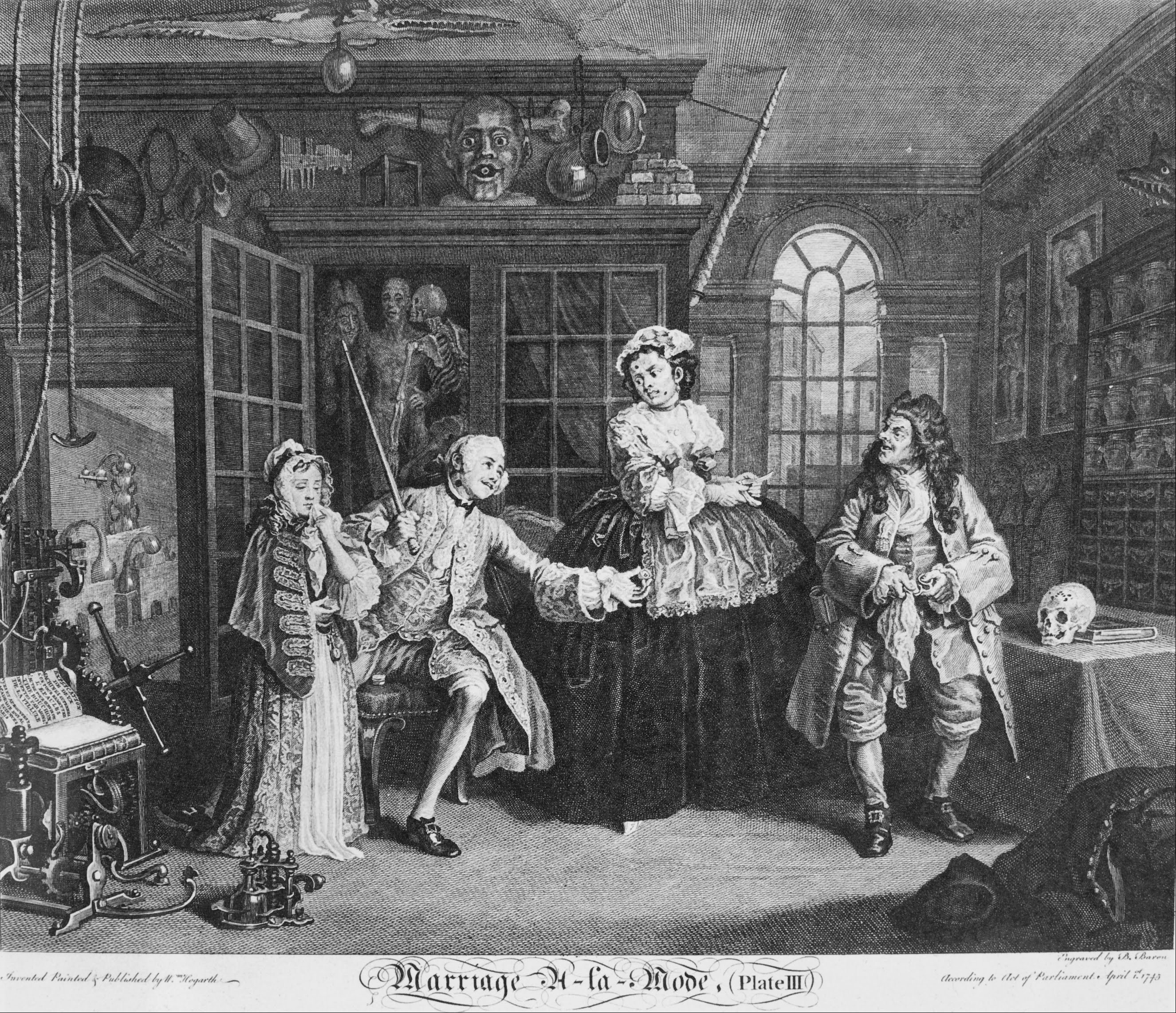
"Marriage à la Mode, Plate 3, (The Scene with the Quack)" by William Hogarth, 1745

Prior to the nineteenth century European medical training and practice was ostensibly self-regulated through a variety of antique corporations, guilds or colleges. Among regular practitioners, university trained physicians formed a medical elite while provincial surgeons and apothecaries, who learnt their art through apprenticeship, made up the lesser ranks. In Old Regime France, licenses for medical practitioners were granted by the medical faculties of the major universities, such as the Paris Faculty of Medicine. Access was restricted and successful candidates, amongst other requirements, had to pass examinations and pay regular fees. In the Austrian Empire medical licences were granted by the Universities of Prague and Vienna. Amongst the German states the top physicians were academically qualified and typically attached to medical colleges associated with the royal court. The theories and practices included the science of anatomy and that the blood circulated by a pumping heart, and contained some empirically gained information on progression of disease and about surgery, but were otherwise unscientific, and were almost entirely ineffective and dangerous.

Outside of these formal medical structures there were myriad other medical practitioners, often termed irregulars, plying a range of services and goods. The eighteenth-century medical marketplace, a period often referred to as the "Golden Age of quackery", (Note: First recorded in use in English in the early seventeenth century, quack is a contracted form of the word "quacksalver" which is of early modern Dutch origin (kwakzalver; first recorded in 1543) and describes a person who heals through the use of home remedies. Further etymological elaborations are speculative. Roy Porter suggests that it indicated a quicksilver doctor as mercury, also known as quicksilver, was then typically used in the treatment of syphilis. The Oxford English Dictionary suggests that "quack" may be derived from the Dutch kwak, which means rubbish or scrap, but the first use of the word with this meaning is not recorded until 1599. It proposes that otherwise the term may come from the early modern Dutch word quacken (kwaken) the meaning of which is to boast, squawk or chatter and may refer pejoratively to the hectoring marketplace promotion of quacks and mountebanks. Zalver means a person who uses ointments to heal (from zalven to rub with ointment). In sixteenth-century Germany the term Quacksalber was in use; in Sweden in the seventeenth century it was kvacksalvare; and in eighteenth-century Denmark one finds kvaksalver.) was a highly pluralistic one that lacked a well-defined and policed division between "conventional" and "unconventional" medical practitioners. In much of continental Europe legal remedies served to control at least the most egregious forms of "irregular" medical practice but the medical market in both Britain and American was less restrained through regulation. Quackery in the period prior to modern medical professionalisation should not be considered equivalent to alternative medicine as those commonly deemed quacks were not peripheral figures by default nor did they necessarily promote oppositional and alternative medical systems. Indeed, the charge of 'quackery', which might allege medical incompetence, avarice or fraud, was levelled quite indiscriminately across the varied classes of medical practitioners be they regular medics, such as the hierarchical, corporate classes of physicians, surgeons and apothecaries in England, or irregulars such as nostrum mongers, bonesetters and local wise-women. Commonly, however, quackery was associated with a growing medical entrepreneurship amongst both regular and irregular practitioners in the provision of goods and services along with associated techniques of advertisement and self-promotion in the medical marketplace. The constituent features of the medical marketplace during the eighteenth century were the development of medical consumerism and a high degree of patient power and choice in the selection of treatments, the limited efficacy of available medical therapies, and the absence of both medical professionalisation and enforced regulation of the market.

== Medical professionalisation ==
In the late eighteenth and nineteenth centuries regular and irregular medical practitioners became more clearly differentiated throughout much of Europe. In part, this was achieved through processes of state-sanctioned medical regulation. The different types of regulatory medical markets created across nineteenth-century Europe and America reflected differing historical patterns of state formation. Where states had traditionally enjoyed strong, centralised power, such as in the German states, government more easily assumed control of the medical regulation. In states that had exercised weaker central power and adopted a free-market model, such as in Britain, government gradually assumed greater control over medical regulation as part of increasing state focus on issues of public health. This process was significantly complicated in Britain by the enduring existence of the historical medical colleges. A similar process is observable in America from the 1870s but this was facilitated by the absence of medical corporations. Throughout the nineteenth century, however, most Western states converged in the creation of legally delimited and semi-protected medical markets. It is at this point that an "official" medicine, created in cooperation with the state and employing a scientific rhetoric of legitimacy, emerges as a recognisable entity and that the concept of alternative medicine as a historical category becomes tenable.

France provides perhaps one of the earliest examples of the emergence of a state-sanctioned medical orthodoxy – and hence also of the conditions for the development of forms of alternative medicine – the beginnings of which can be traced to the late eighteenth century. In addition to the traditional French medical faculties and the complex hierarchies of practitioners over which they presided, the state increasingly supported new institutions, such as the Société Royale de Médecine (Royal Society of Medicine) which received its royal charter in 1778, that played a role in policing medical practice and the sale of medical nostrums. This system was radically transformed during the early phases of the French Revolution when both the traditional faculties and the new institutions under royal sponsorship were removed and an entirely unregulated medical market was created. This anarchic situation was reformed under the exigencies of war when in 1793 the state established national control over medical education; under Napoleon in 1803 state-control was extended over the licensing of medical practitioners. This latter reform introduced a new hierarchical division between practitioners in the creation of a medical élite of graduate physicians and surgeons, who were at liberty to practice throughout the state, and the lowly officiers de santé who received less training, could only offer their services to the poor, and were restricted in where they could practice. This national system of medical regulation under state-control, exported to regions of Napoleonic conquest such as Italy, the Rhineland and the Netherlands, became paradigmatic in the West and in countries adopting western medical systems. While offering state protection to licensed doctors and establishing a medical monopoly in principle it did not, however, remove competition from irregular practitioners.

== Nineteenth-century non-conventional medicine ==
From the late eighteenth century and more robustly from the mid-nineteenth century a number of non-conventional medical systems developed in the West which proposed oppositional medical systems, criticised orthodox medical practitioners, emphasised patient-centredness, and offered substitutes for the treatments offered by the medical mainstream. While neither the medical marketplace nor irregular practitioners disappeared during the nineteenth century, the proponents of alternative medical systems largely differed from the entrepreneurial quacks of the previous century in eschewing showy self-promotion and instead adopting a more sober and serious self-presentation. The relationship between medical orthodoxy and heterodoxy was complex, both categories contained considerably variety, were subject to substantial change throughout the period, and the divisions between the two were frequently blurred.

Many alternative notions grew out of the Lebensreform movement, which emphasized the goodness of nature, the harms to society, people, and to nature caused by industrialization, the importance of the whole person, body and mind, the power of the sun, and the goodness of "the old ways".

The variety of alternative medical systems which developed during this period can be approximately categorised according to the form of treatment advocated. These were: those employing spiritual or psychological therapies, such as hypnosis (mesmerism); nutritional therapies based upon special diets, such as medical botany; drug and biological therapies such as homeopathy and hydrotherapy; and, manipulative physical therapies such as osteopathy and chiropractic massage. Non-conventional medicine might define health in terms of concepts of balance and harmony or espouse vitalistic doctrines of the body. Illness could be understood as due to the accretion of bodily toxins and impurities, to result from magical, spiritual, or supernatural causes, or as arising from energy blockages in the body such that healing actions might constitute energy transfer from practitioner to patient.

=== Mesmerism ===
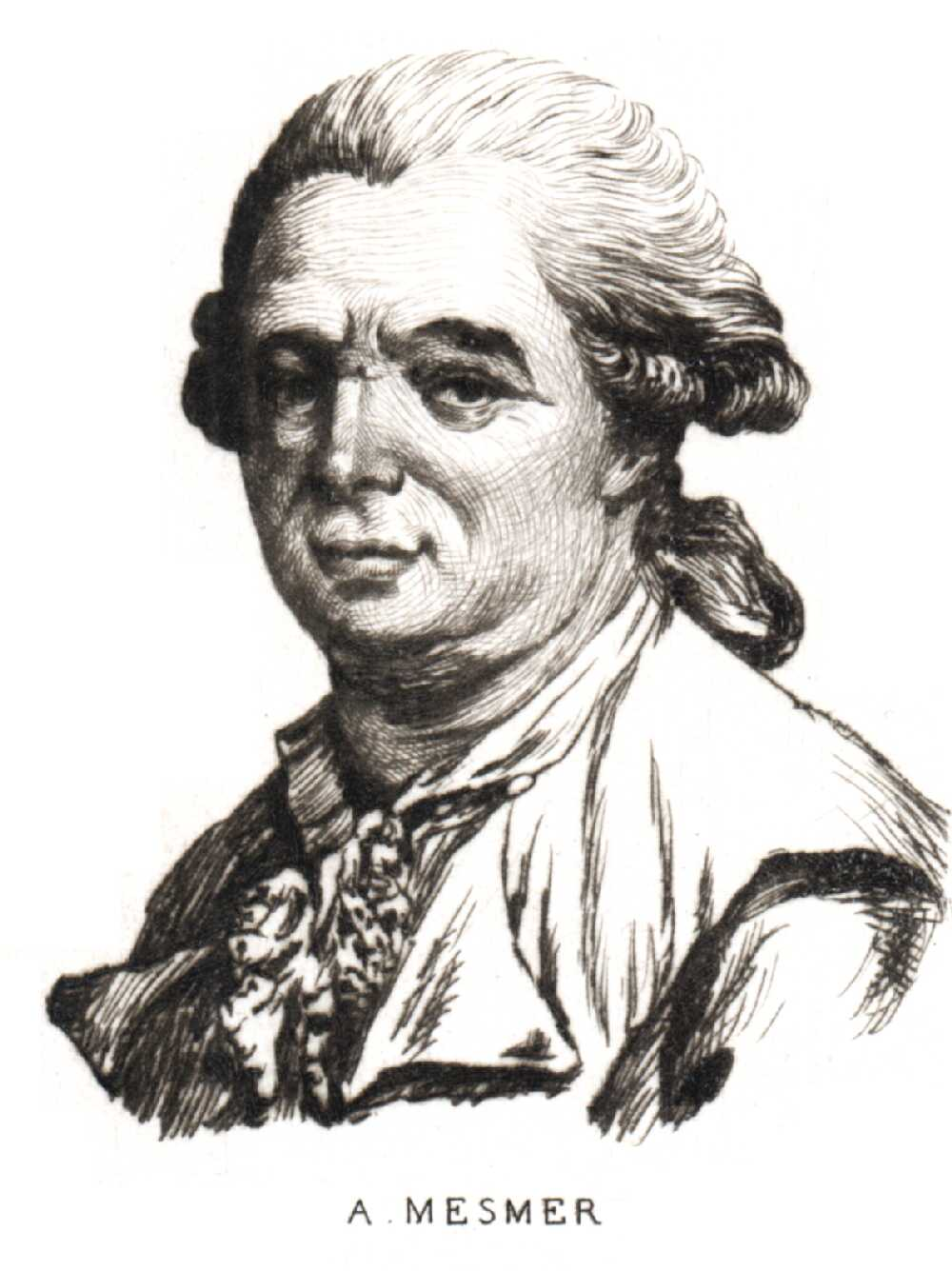
Franz Anton Mesmer (1734–1815)

Mesmerism is the medical system proposed in the late eighteenth century by the Viennese-trained physician, Franz Anton Mesmer (1734–1815), for whom it is named. The basis of this doctrine was Mesmer's claimed discovery of a new aetherial fluid, animal magnetism, which, he contended, permeated the universe and the bodies of all animate beings and whose proper balance was fundamental to health and disease. Animal magnetism was but one of series of postulated subtle fluids and substances, such as caloric, phlogiston, magnetism, and electricity, which then suffused the scientific literature. It also reflected Mesmer's doctoral thesis, De Planatarum Influxu ("On the Influence of the Planets"), which had investigated the impact of the gravitational effect of planetary movements on fluid-filled bodily tissues. His focus on magnetism and the therapeutic potential of magnets was derived from his reading of Paracelsus, Athanasius Kircher and Johannes Baptista van Helmont. The immediate impetus for his medical speculation, however, derived from his treatment of a patient, Franzisca Oesterlin, who suffered from episodic seizures and convulsions which induced vomiting, fainting, temporary blindness and paralysis. His cure consisted of placing magnets upon her body which consistently produced convulsive episodes and a subsequent diminution of symptoms. According to Mesmer, the logic of this cure suggested that health was dependent upon the uninterrupted flow of a putative magnetic fluid and that ill health was consequent to its blockage. His treatment methods claimed to resolve this by either directly transferring his own superabundant and naturally occurring animal magnetism to his patients by touch or through the transmission of these energies from magnetic objects.

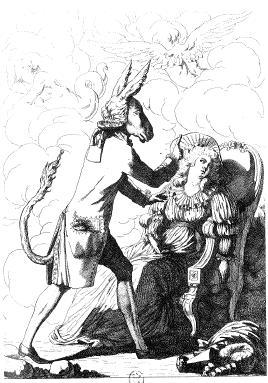
Caricature of a practitioner of animal magnetism treating a patient, c. 1780

By 1775 Mesmer's Austrian practice was prospering and he published the text Schrieben über die Magnetkur an einen auswärtigen Arzt which first outlined his thesis of animal magnetism. In 1778, however, he became embroiled in a scandal resulting from his treatment of a young, blind patient who was connected to the Viennese court and relocated to Paris where he established a medical salon, "The Society of Harmony", for the treatment of patients. Recruiting from a client-base drawn predominantly from society women of the middle- and upper-classes, Mesmer held group séances at his salubrious salon-clinic which was physically dominated by a large, lidded, wooden tank, known as the baquet, containing iron, glass and other material that Mesmer had magnetized and which was filled with "magnetized water". At these sessions patients were enjoined to take hold of the metal rods emanating from the tub which acted as a reservoir for the animal magnetism derived from Mesmer and his clients. Mesmer, through the apparent force of his will – not infrequently assisted by an intense gaze or the administration of his wand – would then direct these energies into the afflicted bodies of his patients seeking to provoke either a "crisis" or a trance-like state; outcomes which he believed essential for healing to occur. Patient proclamations of cure ensured that Mesmer enjoyed considerable and fashionable success in late-eighteenth-century Paris where he occasioned something of a sensation and a scandal.

Popular caricature of mesmerism emphasised the eroticised nature of the treatment as spectacle: "Here the physician in a coat of lilac or purple, on which the most brilliant flowers have been painted in needlework, speaks most consolingly to his patients: his arms softly enfolding her sustain her in her spasms, and his tender burning eye expresses his desire to comfort her". Responding chiefly to the hint of sexual impropriety and political radicalism imbuing these séances, in 1784 mesmerism was subject to a commission of inquiry by a royal-appointed scientific panel of the prestigious French Académie de Médicine. (Note: Mesmer had in fact sought such an inquiry to legitimate the scientific status of mesmerism. He was disappointed, however, that they chose to investigate the clinic of one of his acolytes, Charles d'Elson, rather than his own. Four leading doctors from the faculty of medicine sat on this commission together with five members of the Academy of Sciences, including Jean Sylvain Bailly, Antoine Lavoisier, and Benjamin Franklin. Another government-appointed commission to investigate mesmerism, composed of members from the Royal Society of Medicine, was also established in 1778.) Its findings were that animal magnetism had no basis in fact and that Mesmer's cures had been achieved through the power of suggestion. The commission's report, if damaging to the personal status of Mesmer and to the professional ambitions of those faculty physicians who had adopted mesmeric practices, (Note: Physicians who persisted in the practice of animal magnetism were struck off the register of the medical faculty.) did little to hinder the diffusion of the doctrine of animal magnetism.

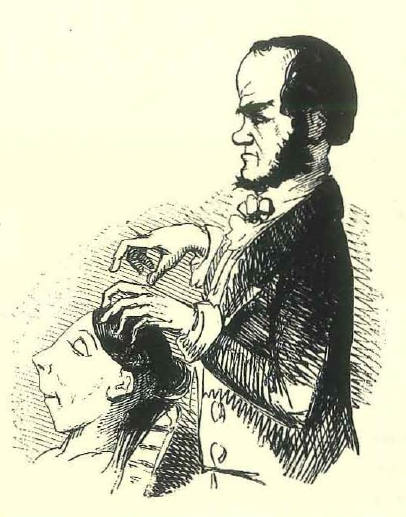
1843 Punch magazine caricature depicting John Elliotson "playing the brain" of a working-class, mesmerised woman

In England mesmerism was championed by John Elliotson, Professor of Practical Medicine at University College London and the founder and president of the London Phrenological Society. A prominent and progressive orthodox physician, he was President of the Medico-Chirugical Society of London and an early adopter of the stethoscope in English medical practice. He had been introduced to mesmerism in the summer of 1837 by the French physician and former student of Mesmer, Dupotet, who is credited as the most significant cross-channel influence on the development of mesmerism in England. Elliotson believed that animal magnetism provided the basis for a consideration of the mind and will in material terms thus allowing for their study as medical objects. Initially supported by The Lancet, a reformist medical journal, he contrived to demonstrate the scientific properties of animal magnetism as a physiological process on the predominantly female charity patients under his care in the University College Hospital. Working-class patients were preferred as experimental subjects to exhibit the physical properties of mesmerism on the nervous system as, being purportedly more animalistic and machine-like than their social superiors, their personal characteristics were deemed less likely to interfere with the experimental process. He sought to reduce his subjects to the status of mechanical automata claiming that he could, through the properties of animal magnetism and the pacifying altered states of consciousness which it induced, "play" their brains as if they were musical instruments.

Two Irish-born charity patients, the adolescent O'Key sisters, emerged as particularly important to Elliotson's increasingly popular and public demonstrations of mesmeric treatment. Initially, his magnetising practices were used to treat the sisters' shared diagnosis of hysteria and epilepsy in controlling or curtailing their convulsive episodes. By the autumn of 1837 Elliotson had ceased to treat the O'Keys merely as suitable objects for cure and instead sought to mobilise them as diagnostic instruments. When in states of mesmeric entrancement the O'Key sisters, due to the apparent increased sensitization of their nervous system and sensory apparatus, behaved as if they had the ability to see through solid objects, including the human body, and thus aid in medical diagnosis. As their fame rivalled that of Elliotson, however, the O'Keys behaved less like human diagnostic machines and became increasingly intransigent to medical authority and appropriated to themselves the power to examine, diagnose, prescribe treatment and provide a prognosis. The emergence of this threat to medical mastery in the form of a pair of working-class, teenage girls without medical training aroused general disquiet amongst the medical establishment and cost Elliotson one of his early and influential supporters, the leading proponent of medical reform, Thomas Wakley. Wakley, the editor of The Lancet, had initially hoped that Elliotson's scientific experiments with animal magnetism might further the agenda of medical reform in bolstering the authority of the profession through the production of scientific truth and, equally importantly in a period when the power-relations between doctors and patients were being redefined, quiescent patient bodies. Perturbed by the O'Key's provocative displays, Wakely convinced Elliotson to submit his mesmeric practice to a trial in August 1838 before a jury of ten gentlemen during which he accused the sisters of fraud and his colleague of gullibility. Following a series of complaints issued to the Medical Committee of University College Hospital they elected to discharge the O'Keys along with other mesmeric subjects in the hospital and Elliotson resigned his post in protest.

This set-back, while excluding Elliotson from the medical establishment, ended neither his mesmeric career nor the career of mesmerism in England. From 1842 he became an advocate of phreno-mesmerism – an approach that amalgamated the tenets of phrenology with animal magnetism and that led to a split in the Phrenological Society. The following year he founded, together with the physician and then President of the Phrenological Society, William Collins Engledue, the principal journal on animal magnetism entitled The Zoist: A Journal of Cerebral Physiology and Mesmerism and their Application to Human Welfare, a quarterly publication which remained in print until its fifty-second issue in January 1856. Mesmeric societies, frequently patronised by those among the scientific and social elite were established in many major population centres in Britain from the 1840s onwards. Some sufficiently endowed societies, such as those in London, Bristol and Dublin, Ireland, supported mesmeric infirmaries with permanent mesmeric practitioners in their employ. Due to the competing rise of spiritualism and psychic research by the mid-1860s these mesmeric infirmaries had closed.

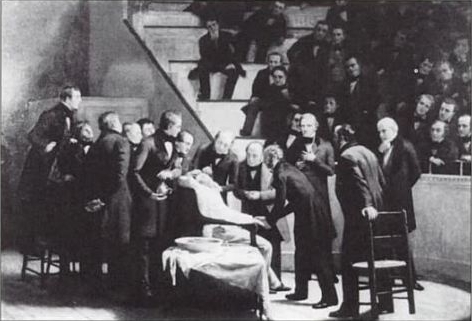
The First Operation under Ether, painted by Robert Hinckley 1881–1896. This operation on the jaw of a female patient took place in Boston on 19 October 1846. William Morton acted as the anaesthetist and John Morrow was the surgeon

The 1840s in Britain also witnessed a deluge of travelling magnetisers who put on public shows for paying audiences to demonstrate their craft. These mesmeric theatres, intended in part as a means of soliciting profitable private clientele, functioned as public fora for debate between skeptics and believers as to whether the performances were genuine or constituted fraud. In order to establish that the loss of sensation under mesmeric trance was real, these itinerant mesmerists indulged in often quite violent methods – including discharging firearms close to the ears of mesmerised subjects, pricking them with needles, putting acid on their skin and knives beneath their fingernails.

Such displays of the anaesthetic qualities of mesmerism inspired some medical practitioners to attempt surgery on subjects under the spell of magnetism. In France, the first major operation of this kind had been trialled, apparently successfully, as early as 1828 during a mastectomy procedure. In Britain the first significant surgical procedure undertaken on a patient while mesmerised occurred in 1842 when James Wombell, a labourer from Nottingham, had his leg amputated. Having been mesmerised for several days prior to the operation by a barrister named William Topham, Wombell exhibited no signs of pain during the operation and reported afterwards that the surgery had been painless. This account was disputed by many in the medical establishment who held that Wombell had fraudulently concealed the pain of the amputation both during and after the procedure. Undeterred, in 1843 Elliotson continued to advocate for the use of animal magnetism in surgery publishing Numerous Cases of Surgical Operation without Pain in the Mesmeric State. This marked the beginning of a campaign by London mesmerists to gain a foothold for the practice within British hospitals by convincing both doctors and the general public of the value of surgical mesmerism. Mesmeric surgery enjoyed considerable success in the years from 1842 to 1846 and colonial India emerged as a particular stronghold of the practice; word of its success was propagated in Britain through the Zoist and the publication in 1846 of Mesmerism in India and its Practical Application in Surgery and Medicine by James Esdaile, a Scottish surgeon with the East India Company and the chief proponent of animal magnetism in the subcontinent.

Although a few surgeons and dentists had undertaken fitful experiments with anaesthetic substances in the preceding years, it was only in 1846 that use of ether in surgery was popularised amongst orthodox medical practitioners. This was despite the fact that the desensitising effects of widely available chemicals like ether and nitrous oxide were commonly known and had formed part of public and scientific displays over the previous half-century.

A feature of the dissemination of magnetism in the New World was its increasing association with spiritualism. By the 1830s mesmerism was making headway in the United States amongst figures like the intellectual progenitor of the New Thought movement, Phineas Parkhurst Quimby, whose treatment combined verbal suggestion with touch. Quimby's most celebrated "disciple", Mary Baker Eddy, would go on to found the "medico-religious hybrid", Christian Science, in the latter half of the nineteenth century. In the 1840s the American spiritualist Andrew Jackson Davis sought to combine animal magnetism with spiritual beliefs and postulated that bodily health was dependent upon the unobstructed movement of the "spirit", conceived as a fluid substance, throughout the body. As with Quimby, Davis's healing practice involved the use of touch.

=== Thomsonianism ===
Thomsonianism was an early 19th century American-based system of alternative medicine, developed and promoted by Samuel Thomson. It grew rapidly during the Popular Health Movement when many Americans distrusted expertise in general and physicians in particular. It was based on herbal treatments designed to regulate body heat, and rejected drugs, heavy bleeding and surgery. The cult faltered and factionalized in the 1850s, and was largely a spent force by the 1860s. However, its emphasis on herbal remedies was copied by other herbalist sects.

=== Osteopathic and chiropractic manipulation ===
Deriving from the tradition of 'bone-setting' and a belief in the flow of supernatural energies in the body (vitalism), both osteopathy and chiropractic developed in the US in the late 19th century. The British School of Osteopathy was established in 1917 but it was the 1960s before the first chiropractic college was established in the UK. Chiropractic theories and methods (which are concerned with subluxations or small displacements of the spine and other joints) do not accord with orthodox medicine's current knowledge of the biomechanics of the spine. in addition to teaching osteopathic manipulative medicine (OMM) and theory, osteopathic colleges in the US gradually came to have the same courses and requirements as biomedical schools, whereby osteopathic doctors (ODs) who did practice OMM were considered to be practicing conventional biomedicine in the US. The passing of the Osteopaths Act (1993) and the Chiropractors Act (1994), however, created for the first time autonomous statutory regulation for two CAM therapies in the UK.

==== History of chiropractic ====
Chiropractic began in the United States in 1895. when Daniel David Palmer performed the first chiropractic adjustment on a partially deaf janitor, who then claimed he could hear better as a result of the manipulation. Palmer opened a school of chiropractic two years later. Chiropractic's early philosophy was rooted in vitalism, naturalism, magnetism, spiritualism and other unscientific constructs. Palmer claimed to merge science and metaphysics. Palmer's first descriptions and underlying philosophy of chiropractic described the body as a "machine" whose parts could be manipulated to produce a drugless cure, that spinal manipulation could improve health, and that the effects of chiropractic spinal manipulation as being mediated primarily by the nervous system.

Despite their similarities, osteopathic practitioners sought to differentiate themselves by seeking regulation of the practices. In a 1907 test of the new law, a Wisconsin based chiropractor was charged with practicing osteopathic medicine without a license. Practicing medicine without a license led to many chiropractors, including D.D. Palmer, being jailed. Chiropractors won their first test case, but prosecutions instigated by state medical boards became increasingly common and successful. Chiropractors responded with political campaigns for separate licensing statutes, from osteopaths, eventually succeeding in all fifty states, from Kansas in 1913 through Louisiana in 1974.

Divisions developed within the chiropractic profession, with "mixers" combining spinal adjustments with other treatments, and "straights" relying solely on spinal adjustments. A conference sponsored by the National Institutes of Health in 1975 spurred the development of chiropractic research. In 1987, the American Medical Association called chiropractic an "unscientific cult" and boycotted it until losing a 1987 antitrust case.

== Histories of individual traditional medical systems ==
=== Ayurvedic medicine ===
Ayurveda or ayurvedic medicine has more than 5,000 years of history, now re-emerging as texts become increasingly accessible in modern English translations. These texts attempt to translate the Sanskrit versions that have remained hidden in India since British occupation from 1755 to 1947. As modern archaeological evidence from Harappa and Mohenja-daro is distributed, Ayurveda has now been accepted as the world's oldest concept of health and disease discovered by man and the oldest continuously practiced system of medicine. Ayurveda is a world view that advocates man's allegiance and surrender to the forces of Nature that are increasingly revealed in modern physics, chemistry and biology. It is based on an interpretation of disease and health that parallels the forces of nature, observing the sun's fire and making analogies to the fires of the body; observing the flows in Nature and describing flows in the body, terming the principle as Vata; observing the transformations in Nature and describing transformations in the body, terming the principle as Pitta; and observing the stability in Nature and describing stability in the body, terming the principle as Kapha.

Ayurveda can be defined as the system of medicine described in the great medical encyclopedias associated with the names Caraka, Suśruta, and Bhela, compiled and re-edited over several centuries from about 200 BCE to about 500 CE and written in Sanskrit. These discursive writings were gathered and systematized in about 600 CE by Vāgbhaṭa, to produce the Aṣṭāṅgahṛdayasaṃhitā ('Heart of Medicine Compendium') that became the most popular and widely used textbook of ayurvedic medicine in history. Vāgbhaṭa's work was translated into many other languages and became influential throughout Asia.

Its prehistory goes back to Vedic culture and its proliferation in written form flourished in Buddhist times. Although the hymns of the Atharvaveda and the Ṛgveda mention some herbal medicines, protective amulets, and healing prayers that recur in the ciphered slokas of later ayurvedic treatises, the earliest historical mention of the main structural and theoretical categories of ayurvedic medicine occurs in the Buddhist Pāli Tripiṭaka, or Canon.

Ayurveda originally derived from the Vedas, as the name suggests, and was first organized and captured in Sanskrit in ciphered form by physicians teaching their students judicious practice of healing. These ciphers are termed slokas and are purposefully designed to include several meanings, to be interpreted appropriately, known as 'tantra yukti' by the knowledgeable practitioner. Ayu means longevity or healthy life, and veda means human-interpreted and observable truths and provable science. The principles of Ayurveda include systematic means for allowing evidence, including truth by observation and experimentation, pratyaksha; attention to teachers with sufficient experience, aptoupadesha; analogy to things seen in Nature, anumana; and logical argument, yukti.

It was founded on several principles, including yama (time) and niyama (self-regulation) and placed emphasis on routines and adherence to cycles, as seen in Nature. For example, it directs that habits should be regulated to coincide with the demands of the body rather than the whimsical mind or evolving and changing nature of human intelligence. Thus, for the follower of ayurvedic medicine, food should only be taken when they are instinctively hungry rather than at an arbitrarily set meal-time. Ayurveda also teaches that when a person is tired, it is not wise to eat food or drink, but to rest, as the body's fire is low and must gather energy in order to alight the enzymes that are required to digest food. The same principles of regulated living, called Dinacharya, direct that work is the justification for rest and in order to get sufficient sleep, one should subject the body to rigorous exercise. Periodic fasting, or abstaining from all food and drink for short durations of one or two days helps regulate the elimination process and prevents illness. It is only in later years that practitioners of this system saw that people were not paying for their services, and in order to get their clients to pay, they introduced herbal remedies to begin with and later even started using metals and inorganic chemical compositions in the form of pills or potions to deal with symptoms.

Emigration from the Indian sub-continent in the 1850s brought practitioners of Ayurveda ('Science of Life'). a medical system dating back over 2,500 years, its adoption outside the Asian communities was limited by its lack of specific exportable skills and English-language reference books until adapted and modernised forms, New Age Ayurveda and Maharishi Ayurveda, came under the umbrella of CAM in the 1970s to Europe. In Britain, Unani practitioners are known as hakims and Ayurvedic practitioners are known as vaidyas. Having its origins in the Ayurveda, Indian naturopathy incorporates a variety of holistic practices and natural remedies and became increasingly popular after the arrival of the post-Second World War wave of Indian immigrants. The Persian work for Greek, Unani medicines uses some similar materials as Ayurveda but are based on philosophy closer to Greek and Arab sources than to Ayurveda. Exiles fleeing the war between Yemen and Aden in the 1960s settled nearby the ports of Cardiff and Liverpool and today practitioners of this Middle Eastern medicine are known as vaids..

In the US, Ayurveda has increased popularity since the 1990s, as Indian-Americans move into the mainstream media, and celebrities visit India more frequently. In addition, many Americans go to India for medical tourism to avail of reputed Ayurvedic medical centers that are licensed and credentialed by the Indian government and widely legitimate as a medical option for chronic medical conditions. AAPNA, the Association of Ayurvedic Professionals of North America, www.aapna.org, has over 600 medical professional members, including trained vaidyas from accredited schools in India credentialed by the Indian government, who are now working as health counselors and holistic practitioners in the US. There are over 40 schools of Ayurveda throughout the US, providing registered post-secondary education and operating mostly as private ventures outside the legitimized medical system, as there is no approval system yet in the US Dept of Education. Practitioners graduating from these schools and arriving with credentials from India practice legally through the Health Freedom Act, legalized in 13 states. Credentialing and a uniform standard of education is being developed by the international CAC, Council of Ayurvedic Credentialing, www.cayurvedac.com, in consideration of the licensed programs in Ayurveda operated under the Government of India's Ministry of Health and Family Welfare, Dept of AYUSH. In India, there are over 600,000 practicing physicians of Ayurveda. Ayurveda is a legal and legitimate medical system in many countries of South Asia.

=== Chinese culture ===
Traditional Chinese medicine has more than 4,000 years of history as a system of medicine that is based on a philosophical concept of balance ( yin and yang, Qi, Blood, Jing, Bodily fluids, the Five Elements, the emotions, and the spirit) approach to health that is rooted in Taoist philosophy and Chinese culture. As such, the concept of it as an alternative form of therapeutic practise is only found in the Western world.

The arrival into Britain of thousands of Chinese in the 1970s introduced traditional Chinese medicine – a system dating back to the Bronze Age or earlier that used acupuncture, herbs, diet and exercise. Today there are more than 2,000 registered practitioners in the UK.

== Since the 1970s ==
Until the 1970s, western practitioners that were not part of the medical establishment were referred to "irregular practitioners", "drugless healers", or "sanipractors", and were dismissed by the medical establishment as unscientific or quackery. Irregular practice became increasingly marginalized as quackery and fraud, as western medicine increasingly incorporated scientific methods and discoveries, and had a corresponding increase in success of its treatments. In the 1970s, irregular practices were grouped with traditional practices of nonwestern cultures, and with other unproven or disproven practices that were not part of biomedicine, and the entire group began to be marketed and promoted as "alternative medicine". Following the counterculture movement of the 1960s, misleading marketing campaigns promoting "alternative medicine" as an effective "alternative" to biomedicine, and with changing social attitudes about not using chemicals, challenging the establishment and authority of any kind, sensitivity to giving equal measure to values and beliefs of other cultures and their practices through cultural relativism, adding postmodernism and deconstructivism to ways of thinking about science and its deficiencies, and with growing frustration and desperation by patients about limitations and side effects of evidence-based medicine, use of alternative medicine in the west began to rise, then had explosive growth beginning in the 1990s, when senior level political figures began promoting alternative medicine, and began diverting government medical research funds into research of alternative, complementary, and integrative medicine.

=== 1990s through 2010s ===
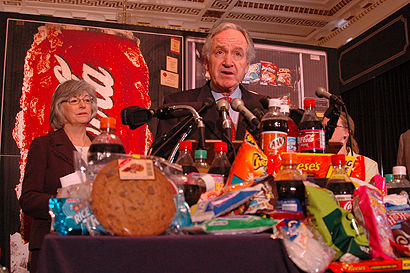
Sen. Tom Harkin at a press conference.

In 1991, after United States Senator Thomas Harkin became convinced his allergies were cured by taking bee pollen pills, he used $2 million of his discretionary funds to create the Office of Alternative Medicine (OAM), to test the efficacy of alternative medicine and alert the public as the results of testing its efficacy. The OAM mission statement was that it was "dedicated to exploring complementary and alternative healing practices in the context of rigorous science; training complementary and alternative medicine researchers; and disseminating authoritative information to the public and professionals." Joseph M. Jacobs was appointed the first director of the OAM in 1992. Jacobs' insistence on rigorous scientific methodology caused friction with Senator Harkin. Harkin criticized the "unbendable rules of randomized clinical trials" and, citing his use of bee pollen to treat his allergies, stated: "It is not necessary for the scientific community to understand the process before the American public can benefit from these therapies." Increasing political resistance to the use of scientific methodology was publicly criticized by Dr. Jacobs and another OAM board member complained that "nonsense has trickled down to every aspect of this office". In 1994, Senator Harkin responded by appearing on television with cancer patients who blamed Dr. Jacobs for blocking their access to untested cancer treatment, leading Jacobs to resign in frustration. The OAM drew increasing criticism from eminent members of the scientific community, from a Nobel laureate criticizing the degrading parts of the NIH to the level a cover for quackery, and the president of the American Physical Society criticizing spending on testing practices that "violate basic laws of physics and more clearly resemble witchcraft". In 1998, the President of the North Carolina Medical Association publicly called for shutting down the OAM. The NIH Director placed the OAM under more strict scientific NIH control.

In 1998, Sen. Harkin responded to the criticism and stricter scientific controls by the NIH, by raising the OAM to the level of an independent center, increasing its budget to $90 million annually, and renaming it to be the National Center for Complementary and Alternative Medicine (NCCAM). The United States Congress approved the appropriations without dissent. NCCAM had a mandate to promote a more rigorous and scientific approach to the study of alternative medicine, research training and career development, outreach, and integration. In 2014 the agency was renamed to the National Center for Complementary and Integrative Health (NCCIH). The NCCIH charter requires that 12 of the 18 council members shall be selected with a preference to selecting leading representatives of complementary and alternative medicine, 9 of the members must be licensed practitioners of alternative medicine, 6 members must be general public leaders in the fields of public policy, law, health policy, economics, and management, and 3 members must represent the interests of individual consumers of complementary and alternative medicine.

In 2001, the White House had commissioned the White House Commission on Complementary and Alternative Medicine Policy.

By 2009, the NCCIH budget had grown from annual spending of about $2 million at its inception, to $123 million annually. In 2009, after a history of 17 years of government testing produced almost no clearly proven efficacy of alternative therapies, Senator Harkin complained, "One of the purposes of this center was to investigate and validate alternative approaches. Quite frankly, I must say publicly that it has fallen short. It think quite frankly that in this center and in the office previously before it, most of its focus has been on disproving things rather than seeking out and approving." Members of the scientific and biomedical communities complained in 2009 that after 10 years of being tested, at a cost of over $2.5 Billion on testing scientifically and biologically implausible practices, almost no alternative therapy showed clear efficacy.

From 1990 to 1997, use of alternative medicine in the US increased by 25%, with a corresponding 50% increase in expenditures. By 2013, 50% of Americans were using alternative medicine, and annual spending on CAM in the US was $34 Billion.

=== 2010s to present ===
In 2017 the National Health Service (NHS) in England stopped funding homeopathy "as the lack of any evidence for its effectiveness did not justify the cost." A 2018 UK High Court judgement upheld the NHS decision to cease homeopathy funding.

=== Other periods ===
The terms 'alternative' and 'complementary' tend to be used interchangeably to describe a wide diversity of therapies that attempt to use the self-healing powers of the body by amplifying natural recuperative processes to restore health. In ancient Greece the Hippocratic movement, commonly regarded as the fathers of medicine, actually gave rise to modern naturopathy and indeed much of today's CAM. They placed great emphasis on a good diet and healthy lifestyle to restore equilibrium; drugs were used more to support healing than to cure disease.

Complementary medicines have evolved through history and become formalised from primitive practices; although many were developed during the 19th century as alternatives to the sometimes harmful practices of the time, such as blood-lettings and purgation. In the UK, the medical divide between CAM and conventional medicine has been characterised by conflict, intolerance and prejudice on both sides and during the early 20th century CAM was virtually outlawed in Britain: healers were seen as freaks and hypnotherapists were subject to repeated attempts at legal restriction. The alternative health movement is now accepted as part of modern life, having progressed from a grass-roots revival in the 1960s reacting against environmental degradation, unhealthy diets and rampant consumerism.

Until the arrival of the Romans in AD43, medical practices were limited to a basic use of plant materials, prayers and incantations. Having assimilated the corpus of Hippocrates, the Romans brought with them a vast repertoire of herbal treatments and introduced the concept of the hospital as a centralised treatment centre. In Britain, hydrotherapy (the use of water either internally or externally to maintain health and prevent disease) can be traced back to Roman spas. This was augmented by practices from the Far East and China introduced by traders using the Silk Road.

During the Catholic and Protestant witch-hunts from the 14th to the 17th centuries, the activities of traditional folk-healers were severely curtailed and knowledge was often lost as it existed only as an oral tradition. The widespread emigration from Europe to North America in the 18th and 19th centuries included both the knowledge of herbalism and some of the plants themselves. This was combined with Native American medicine and then re-imported to the UK where it re-integrated with the surviving herbal traditions to evolve as today's medical herbalism movement.

The natural law of similia similibus curantur, or 'like is cured by like', was recognised by Hippocrates but was only developed as a practical healing system in the early 19th century by a German, Dr Samuel Hahnemann. Homeopathy was brought to the UK in the 1830s by a Dr Quinn who introduced it to the British aristocracy, whose patronage continues to this day. Despite arousing controversy in conventional medical circles, homeopathy is available under the National Health Service, and in Scotland approximately 25% of GPs hold qualifications in homeopathy or have undergone some homeopathic training.

The impact on CAM of mass immigration into the UK is continuing into the 21st century. Originating in Japan, cryotherapy has been developed by Polish researchers into a system that claims to produce lasting relief from a variety of conditions such as rheumatism, psoriasis and muscle pain. Patients spend a few minutes in a chamber cooled to −110 °C, during which skin temperature drops some 12 °C.

The use of CAM is widespread and increasing across the developed world. The British are presented with a wide choice of treatments from the traditional to the innovative and technological. Section 60 of the Health Act 1999 allows for new health professions to be created by Order rather than primary legislation. This raises issues of public health policy which balance regulation, training, research, evidence base and funding against freedom of choice in a culturally diverse society.

== Relativist perspective ==
The term alternative medicine refers to systems of medical thought and practice which function as alternatives to or subsist outside of conventional, mainstream medicine. Alternative medicine cannot exist absent an established, authoritative and stable medical orthodoxy to which it can function as an alternative. Such orthodoxy was only established in the West during the nineteenth century through processes of regulation, association, institution building and systematised medical education.

== Notes and references ==
=== Sources ===
==== Printed sources ====
- Angell, M.; Kassirer, J.P. (September 1998), "Alternative Medicine – the Risks of Untested and Unregulated Remedies" (PDF), The New England Journal of Medicine, 339 (12): 839–41, doi:10.1056/NEJM199809173391210, PMID 9738094
- Barrow, Logie (1991), "Why Were Most Medical Heretics at their Most Confident around the 1840s? (The Other Side of Mid-Victorian Medicine)", in Roger French; Andrew Wear (eds.), British Medicine in an Age of Reform, The Wellcome Institute Series in the History of Medicine, London & New York: Routledge, pp. 165–85, ISBN 978-0-415-05622-9
- Bivins, Roberta (2007), Alternative Medicine? A History, Oxford: Oxford University Press, ISBN 978-0-19-921887-5
- Blécourt, Willem de; Usborne, Cornelie (1999a), "Preface: Situating 'Alternative Medicine' in the Modern Period", Medical History, 43 (3): 283–85, doi:10.1017/S0025727300065364, PMC 1044146, PMID 16562317
- Blécourt, Willem de; Usborne, Cornelie (1999b), "Women's Medicine, Women's Culture: Abortion and Fortune-telling in Early Twentieth-century Germany and the Netherlands", Medical History, 43 (3): 376–92, doi:10.1017/s0025727300065418, PMC 1044151, PMID 10885130
- Bradley, James (2002), "Medicine on the Margins? Hydropathy and Orthodoxy in Britain, 1840–60", in Waltraud Ernst (ed.), Plural Medicine, Tradition and Modernity, London & New York: Routledge, pp. 19–39, ISBN 978-0-415-23122-0
- Bradley, James; Dupree, Margueritte (2001), "Opportunity on the Edge of Orthodoxy: Medically Qualified Hydropathists in the Era of Reform, 1840–60", Social History of Medicine, 14 (3): 417–37, doi:10.1093/shm/14.3.417, PMID 11811187
- Brown, Michael (2007), "Medicine, Quackery and the Free Market: The 'War' against Morison's Pills and the Construction of the Medical Profession, c. 1830–c. 1850", in Mark S.R. Jenner; Patrick Wallis (eds.), Medicine and the Market in England and Its Colonies, c. 1450–c. 1850, New York: Palgrave and MacMillan, pp. 238–61, ISBN 978-0-230-50643-5
- Brunton, Deborah (2004), "The Emergence of a Modern Profession?", in Deborah Brunton (ed.), Medicine Transformed: Health, Disease and Society in Europe, 1800–1930, Manchester: Open University, ISBN 978-0-7190-6735-8
- Carter, Neil (2010), "The Rise and Fall of the Magic Sponge: Medicine and the Transformation of the Football Trainer", Social History of Medicine, 23 (2): 261–79, doi:10.1093/shm/hkp060
- Cooter, Roger (1988), "Alternative Medicine, Alternative Cosmology", in Roger Cooter (ed.), Studies in the History of Alternative Medicine, Houndmills: Macmillan press in association with St. Antony's College, Oxford, pp. 140–54, ISBN 978-0-333-46213-3
- Cox, Catherine (2010), "The Medical Marketplace and Medical Tradition in Nineteenth-century Ireland", in Ronnie Moore; Stuart McClean (eds.), Folk Healing and Health Care Practices in Ireland: Stethoscopes, Wands and Crystals, Epistemologies of Healing, New York and Oxford: Berghahn Books, pp. 55–79, ISBN 978-1-84545-672-6
- Crabtree, Adam (2008), "The Transition to Secular Psychotherapy: Hypnosis and the Alternate-Consciousness Paradigm", in Edwin R. Wallace; John Gach (eds.), History of Psychiatry and Medical Psychology: with an Epilogue on Psychiatry and the Mind-Body Relation, New York: Springer, pp. 555–86, ISBN 978-0-387-34707-3
- Darnton, Robert (1968), Mesmerism and the End of the Enlightenment in France, Cambridge MA & London: Harvard University Press, ISBN 978-0-674-56951-5
- Davies, Owen (1999), "Cunning-Folk in the Medical Market-Place During the Nineteenth Century", Medical History, 43 (1): 55–73, doi:10.1017/s0025727300064711, PMC 1044110, PMID 10885133
- Dawes, Laura L. (2012), "When Subjects Bite Back: The Bristol Cancer Help Centre Study and Increasing Consumer Involvement in UK Medical Research in the 1990s", Social History of Medicine, 25 (2): 500–19, doi:10.1093/shm/hkr151
- Digby, Anne (1994-08-26), Making a Medical Living: Doctors and Patients in the English Market for Medicine, 1720–1911, Cambridge Studies in Population, Economy, and Society in Past Time, Cambridge & New York: Cambridge University Press, ISBN 978-0-521-34526-2
- Durbach, Nadja (2000), "'They Might As Well Brand Us': Working-Class Resistance to Compulsory Vaccination in Victorian England", Social History of Medicine, 13 (1): 45–63, doi:10.1093/shm/13.1.45, PMID 11624425
- Fara, Patricia, "Marginalized Practices", in Roy Porter (ed.), The Cambridge History of Science: Volume 4, Eighteenth-Century Science, vol. 4, Cambridge: Cambridge University Press, pp. 485–510, ISBN 978-0-521-57243-9
- Gevitz, Norman (1997), "Unorthodox Medical Theories", in W.F. Bynum; Roy Porter (eds.), Companion Encyclopedia of the History of Medicine, London & New York: Routledge, pp. 603–33, ISBN 978-0-415-16418-4
- Hau, Michael (2000), "The Holistic Gaze in German Medicine, 1890–1930", Bulletin of the History of Medicine, 74 (3): 495–524, doi:10.1353/bhm.2000.0125, PMID 11016096, S2CID 414516
- Hausman, Gary J. (2002), "Making Medicine Indigenous: Homeopathy in South India", Social History of Medicine, 15 (2): 303–22, doi:10.1093/shm/15.2.303, PMID 12638553
- Huisman, F (1999), "Shaping the Medical Market: On the Construction of Quackery and Folk Medicine in Dutch Historiography", Medical History, 43 (3): 359–75, doi:10.1017/s0025727300065406, PMC 1044150, PMID 10885129
- Jacyna, Stephen (2006), "Medicine in Transformation, 1800–1849", in W.F. Bynum; Anne Hardy; Stephen Jacyna; Christopher Lawrence E.M. (Tilli) Tansey (eds.), The Western Medical Tradition 1800 to 2000, New York: Cambridge University Press, ISBN 978-0-521-47524-2
- Jenner, Mark S.R.; Patrick, Wallis (2007), "Introduction", in Mark S.R. Jenner; Patrick Wallis (eds.), Medicine and the Market in England and Its Colonies, c. 1450–c. 1850, New York: Palgrave Macmillan, pp. 1–23, ISBN 978-0-230-50643-5
- Jewson, N.D. (1974), "Medical Knowledge and the Patronage System in 18th Century England", Sociology, 8 (3): 369–85, doi:10.1177/003803857400800302, S2CID 143768672
- Jütte, Robert (1999), "The Historiography of Nonconventional Medicine in Germany: A Concise Overview", Medical History, 43 (3): 342–58, doi:10.1017/S002572730006539X, PMC 1044149, PMID 10885128
- Jütte, Robert (2001), "Alternative Medicine and Medico-Historical Semantics", in Motzi Eklof; Marie C. Nelson (eds.), Historical Aspects of Unconventional Medicine: Approaches, Concepts, Case Studies, European Association for the History of Medicine and Health, pp. 11–26
- Kasper, Dennis L; Fauci, Anthony S.; Hauser, Stephen L.; Longo, Dan L.; Jameson, J. Larry; Loscalzo, Joseph (2015), Harrison's Principles of Internal Medicine (19th ed.), New York: McGraw Hill Education, ISBN 978-0-07-180215-4
- Kenny, Michael G. (2002), "A Darker Shade of Green: Medical Botany, Homeopathy, and Cultural Politics in Interwar Germany", Social History of Medicine, 15 (3): 481–504, doi:10.1093/shm/15.3.481, PMID 12659098
- Loeb, Lori (2005), "Beating the Flu: Orthodox and Commercial Responses to Influenza in Britain, 1889–1919", Social History of Medicine, 18 (2): 203–24, doi:10.1093/sochis/hki030
- Loudon, Irvine (1987), "The Vile Race of Quacks with which this Country is Infested", in W.F. Bynum; Roy Porter (eds.), Medical Fringe and Medical Orthodoxy 1750–1850, London: Croom-Helm, pp. 106–28, ISBN 978-0-7099-3959-7
- Meyer-Renschhausen, E; Wirz, A. (1999), "Dietetics, health reform and social order: Vegetarianism as a moral physiology. The example of Maximilian Bircher-Benner (1867–1939)", Medical History, 43 (3): 323–341, doi:10.1017/s0025727300065388, PMC 1044148, PMID 10885127
- Marland, Hilary (1987), "The Medical Activities of Mid-Nineteenth-Century Chemists and Druggists, with Special Reference to Wakefield and Huddersfield", Medical History, 31 (4): 415–39, doi:10.1017/s002572730004727x, PMC 1139784, PMID 3316877
- Moore Ronnie; Stuart McClean, eds. (2010), Folk Healing and Health Care Practices in Ireland: Stethoscopes, Wands and Crystals, Epistemologies of Healing, New York and Oxford: Berghahn Books, pp. 55–79, ISBN 978-1-84545-672-6
- Marland, Hilary; Adams, J. (2009), "Hydropathy at Home:: The Water Cure and Domestic Healing in Mid-Nineteenth-Century Britain", Bulletin of the History of Medicine, 83 (3): 499–529, doi:10.1353/bhm.0.0251, PMC 2774269, PMID 19801794
- Miley, Ursula; Pickstone, John (1988), "Medical Botany around 1850: American Medicine in Industrial Britain", in Roger Cooter (ed.), Studies in the History of Alternative Medicine, London, ISBN 978-0-333-46213-3
- Ouédraogo, Arouna P. (2001), "Food and the Purification of Society: Dr Paul Carton and Vegetarianism in Interwar France", Social History of Medicine, 14 (2): 223–45, doi:10.1093/shm/14.2.223, PMID 11695355
- Peeters, E. (2010), "Questioning the Medical Fringe: The" Cultural Doxy" of Catholic Hydropathy in Belgium, 1890–1914", Bulletin of the History of Medicine, 84 (1): 92–119, doi:10.1353/bhm.0.0325, PMID 20632734, S2CID 39504917
- Pickstone, John (2006), "Medicine, Society and the State", in Roy Porter (ed.), The Cambridge History of Medicine, New York: Cambridge University Press, pp. 260–97, ISBN 978-0-521-86426-8
- Porter, Roy (1988), "Before the Fringe: 'Quackery' and the Eighteenth-Century Medical Market", in Roger Cooter (ed.), Studies in the History of Alternative Medicine, London: MacMillan, ISBN 978-0-333-46213-3
- Porter, Roy (1999), The Greatest Benefit to Mankind: a Medical History of Humanity from Antiquity to the Present, London: Fontana Press, ISBN 978-0-00-637454-1
- Porter, Roy (2000), Quacks: Fakes & Charlatans in English Medicine, Stroud: Tempus, ISBN 978-0-7524-1776-9
- Ramsey, Matthew (1999), "Alternative Medicine in Modern France", Medical History, 43 (3): 286–322, doi:10.1017/s0025727300065376, PMC 1044147, PMID 10885126
- Sagan, C. (1996), The Demon-Haunted World: Science As a Candle in the Dark, New York: Random House, ISBN 978-0-394-53512-8
- Saks, Mike (2002), "Medicine and the Counterculture", in Roger Cooter; John V. Pickstone (eds.), Companion Encyclopedia of Medicine in the Twentieth Century, London: Routledge, pp. 113–24, ISBN 978-0-415-28603-9
- Schlun, Betsy van (2007), Science and the Imagination: Mesmerism, Media, and the Mind in Nineteenth-Century English and American Literature, Leipzig Explorations in Literature and Culture, Glienicke: Galda & Wilch, ISBN 978-1-931255-22-6
- Schoepflin, Rennie B. (2003), Christian Science on Trial: Religious Healing in America, Baltimore: Johns Hopkins University Press, ISBN 978-0-8018-7057-6
- Sharma, Avi (2011), "Medicine from the Margins? Naturheilkunde from Medical Heterodoxy to the University of Berlin, 1889–1920", Social History of Medicine, 24 (2): 334–51, doi:10.1093/shm/hkq051
- Stanley, Peter (2003), For Fear of Pain: British Surgery, 1790–1850, Clio Medica, vol. 70, Amsterdam & New York: Rodopi, pp. 3–362, ISBN 978-90-420-1034-5, PMID 12737690
- Thompson, Helen (1999), "Gender, or the King's Secret: Franz Anton Mesmer's Magnetic Public Sphere", in Mary Ann O'Farrell; Lynne Vallone (eds.), Virtual Gender: Fantasies of Subjectivity and Embodiment, Ann Arbor: University of Michigan Press, pp. 65–90, ISBN 978-0-472-06708-4
- Timmerman, Carsten (2001), "Rationalizing 'Folk Medicine' in Interwar Germany: Faith, Business, and Science at 'Dr. Madaus & Co.'", Social History of Medicine, 14 (3): 459–82, doi:10.1093/shm/14.3.459, PMID 11811189
- Wakley, Thomas (1 September 1838), "'Animal Magnetism'; or 'Mesmerism'. Experiments Performed on Elizabeth and Jane O'Key at the House of Mr Wakley, Bedford-Square, in August, 1838", The Lancet, 2 (783): 805–11, doi:10.1016/s0140-6736(02)96129-5
- Weatherall, Mark W. (1996), "Making Medicine Scientific: Empiricism, Rationality, and Quackery in mid-Victorian Britain", Social History of Medicine, 9 (2): 175–94, doi:10.1093/shm/9.2.175, PMID 11613446
- Winter, Alison (1998a), Mesmerized: Powers of Mind in Victorian Britain, Science and its Conceptual Foundations, London & Chicago: University of Chicago Press, ISBN 978-0-226-90223-4
- Williams, John Alexander (2007), Turning to nature in Germany: hiking, nudism, and conservation, 1900–1940, Stanford, Calif.: Stanford University Press, ISBN 978-0-8047-0015-3
- Winter, Alison (1998b), "Mesmerism and the Introduction of Surgical Anesthesia to Victorian England" (PDF), Engineering and Science, 61 (2): 30–37
- Winter, Alison (2004) [1991], "Mesmerism vs Ether: a Professional Battle", in Brunton, Deborah (ed.), Health, Disease and Society in Europe, 1800–1930: A Source Book, Manchester & New York: Manchester University Press, pp. 102–110, ISBN 978-0-7190-6739-6, [extracts from Winter, Alison (1991) "Ethereal Epidemic: Mesmerism and the Introduction of Inhalation Anaesthesia to Early Victorian London", Social History of Medicine, 4: 1–27]
- Young, James Harvey (1998), "The Development of the Office of Alternative Medicine in the National Institutes of Health, 1991-1996", Bulletin of the History of Medicine, 72 (2): 279–98, doi:10.1353/bhm.1998.0110, PMID 9628052, S2CID 26685737
- Kaviratna, AC.; Sharma, P. (1996), Caraka Samhita – transl 2e, vol. 1, Delhi: Sir Satguru Publications
- Sreekumar, T. (2011), Astanga Hrdaya, Sutrasthana-I.3e, Mannuthy, Kerala: Harisree Hospital
- SrikanthaMurthy, KR. (2010), Caraka Samhitā, vol. 1, Jaikrishnadas Ayurveda Series 127, Varanasi: Chaukhambha Orientalia
- Ray, Prafulla Chandra (1902), A History of Hindu Chemistry from the earliest times to the middle of the sixteenth century, A.D.,: with Sanskrit texts, variants, translation and illustrations, vol. I, reprint from the collections of the Univ of California Libraries, London & Oxford: William and Norgate
- Varier, NV Krishnankutty (2005), History of Ayurveda, Kottakkal Ayurveda Series:56, Kottakkal: Arya Vaidya Sala

==== Online sources ====
- OED Online (2012a), "quacksalver, n.", Oxford English Dictionary Online, Oxford University Press (subscription required)
- OED Online (2012b), "quack, n.", Oxford English Dictionary Online, Oxford University Press (subscription required)
