= Batcheldor =

Batcheldor is a surname. Notable people with the surname include:

- Daniel Batcheldor (born 1978), Anglo-American astrophysicist
- Kenneth Batcheldor (1921–1988), British clinical psychologist
