= Table-turning =

Type of séance

Table-turning (also known as table-tapping, table-tipping or table-tilting) is a type of séance in which participants sit around a table, place their hands on it, and wait for rotations. The table was purportedly made to serve as a means of communicating with the spirits; the alphabet would be slowly spoken aloud and the table would tilt at the appropriate letter, thus spelling out words and sentences. The process is similar to that of a Ouija board. Scientists and skeptics consider table-turning to be the result of the ideomotor effect, or of conscious trickery.

== History ==
When the movement of spiritualism first reached Europe from America in the winter of 1852–1853, the most popular method of consulting the spirits was for several persons to sit round a table, with their hands resting on it, and wait for the table to move. If the experiment was successful, the table would rotate with considerable rapidity and would occasionally rise in the air, or perform other movements.

Whilst most spiritualists ascribed the table movements to the agency of spirits, two investigators, count de Gasparin and professor Thury (father of René Thury) of Geneva, conducted a careful series of experiments. They claimed to have demonstrated that the movements of the table were due to a physical force emanating from the bodies of the sitters, for which they proposed the name ectenic force. Their conclusion rested on the supposed elimination of all known physical causes for the movements; but it is doubtful from the description of the experiments whether the precautions taken were sufficient to exclude unconscious muscular action (the ideomotor effect) or even deliberate fraud.

In England, table-turning became a fashionable diversion and was practised all over the country in the year 1853. John Elliotson and his followers attributed the phenomena to mesmerism. The general public were content to find the explanation of the movements in spirits, animal magnetism, Odic force, galvanism, electricity, or even the rotation of the earth. Some Evangelical clergymen alleged that the spirits who caused the movements were of a diabolic nature. In France, Allan Kardec studied the phenomenon and concluded in The Book on Mediums that some communications were caused by an outside intelligence, as the message contained information that was not known to the group.

== Scientific reception ==
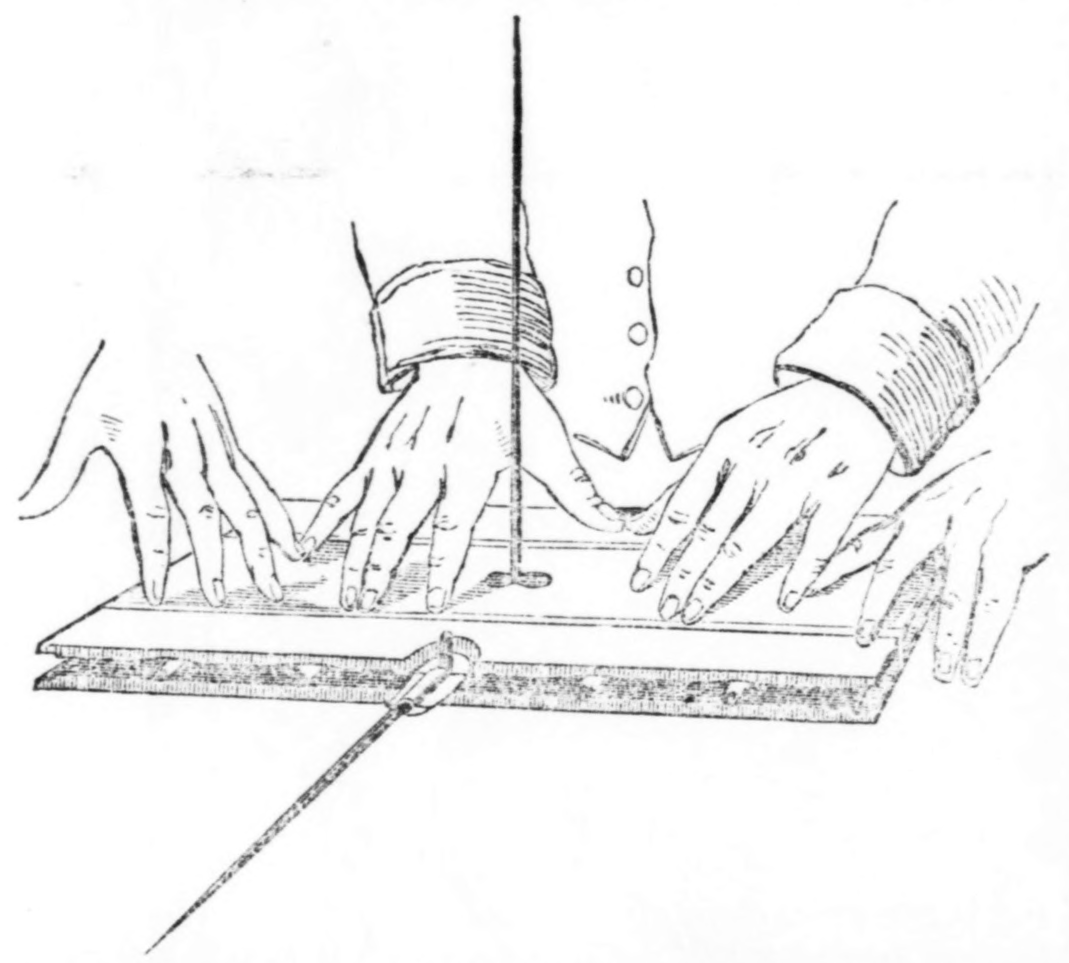
Faraday's apparatus for experimental demonstration of ideomotor effect on table-turning

The Scottish surgeon James Braid, the English physiologist W. B. Carpenter and others pointed out that the phenomena could depend upon the expectation of the sitters, and could be stopped altogether by appropriate suggestion. Michel Eugène Chevreul explained that the purported magical movement was due to involuntary and unconscious muscular reactions.

Michael Faraday devised a simple apparatus which conclusively demonstrated that the movements he investigated were due to unconscious muscular action. The apparatus consisted of two small boards, with glass rollers between them, the whole fastened together by india-rubber bands in such a manner that the upper board could slide under lateral pressure to a limited extent over the lower one. The occurrence of such lateral movement was at once indicated by means of an upright haystalk fastened to the apparatus. When by this means it was made clear to the experimenters that it was the fingers which moved the table, the phenomena generally ceased. After this experimental approach, Faraday criticized the believers of table-turning.

Faraday's work was followed up a century later by clinical psychologist Kenneth Batcheldor who pioneered the use of infrared video recording to observe experimental subjects in complete darkness.

=== Trickery ===
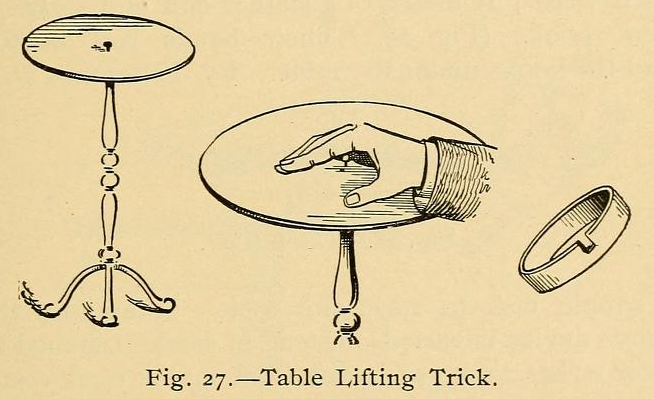
Table lifting trick involving the use of a pin and slotted ring.

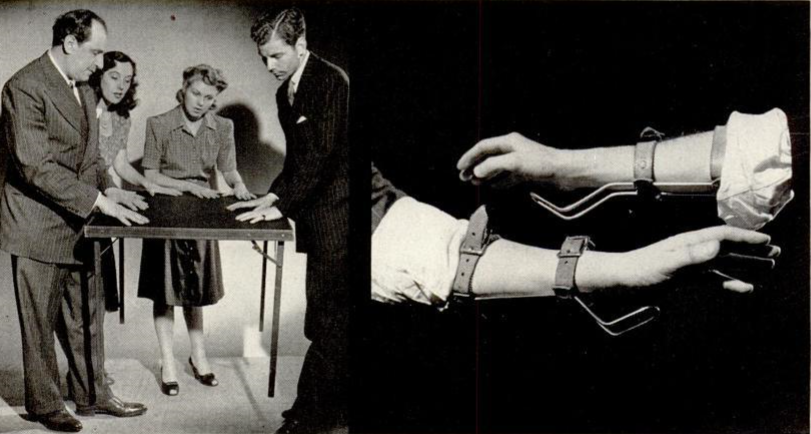
Joseph Dunninger revealing a fraudulent hidden hook method for table-turning.

Apart from the ideomotor effect, conscious fraudulent table tipping has also been uncovered. Professional magicians and skeptics have exposed many of the methods utilized by mediums to tip tables. The magician Chung Ling Soo described a method that involved a pin driven into the table and the use of a ring with a slot on the medium's finger. Once the pin entered the slot, the table could be lifted. Another example comes from Eusapia Palladino, who used custom-made boots with soles that extended beyond the boots' edges in order to lift tables.

According to John Mulholland:

The multiplicity of methods used to tip and raise tables in a séance is almost as great as the number of mediums performing the feat. One of the simplest was to slide the hands back until one or both of the medium's thumbs could catch hold of the table top. Another way was to exert no pressure on the table at all, and in the event that the sitter opposite the medium did press on the table, to permit the table to tip far enough away from him so that he could get the toe of one foot under the table leg. He would then immediately put pressure on his side, and, holding the table between his hands and his toe, move it about at will. By this method a small table can be made to float two feet off the floor... Another method was to catch the under side of the table top with the knee; and still another was merely to kick the table into the air.
