= Kenneth Batcheldor =

British clinical psychologist (1921–1988)

- Born: Kenneth James Batcheldor; 21 March 1921; Watford, England
- Died: 9 March 1988 (aged 66); Exeter, England
- Education: University College London (UCL)
- Known for: Parapsychology, Psychokinesis
- Scientific career
- Fields: Psychology

Kenneth James Batcheldor (27 September 1921 – 9 March 1988) was a British clinical psychologist whose scientific experiments advanced the study of paranormal phenomena, particularly psychokinesis, building on the work of Michael Faraday to investigate unconscious muscular action as an explanation for table-turning. Batcheldor investigated the mental states that were conducive or inhibitory to the effect, attempting to create a repeatable process by which anyone might produce it. Amongst other techniques, he pioneered the experimental use of infrared video recording to observe the actions of subjects in the dark.
