= Daniel Batcheldor =

Anglo-American astrophysicist

- Education: University of Hertfordshire
- Scientific career
- Fields: Astronomy, Astrophysics
- Workplaces: University of Hertfordshire; Rochester Institute of Technology; Florida Institute of Technology
- Doctoral advisor: David Axon

Daniel Batcheldor is an Anglo-American astrophysicist, a former professor at Florida Institute of Technology and Head of the Department of Aerospace, Physics and Space Sciences, and Director of the Jacobus Kapteyn Telescope.

== Early life and education ==
In 2000, Batcheldor served as a student support astronomer at the Isaac Newton Group of Telescopes with responsibilities for the Jacobus Kapteyn Telescope. He received a bachelor's degree in astronomy from the University of Hertfordshire in 2001, and in 2004 he completed his Ph.D. at the same institution.

== Career ==
In 2010, Batcheldor moved to a faculty position at Florida Institute of Technology and became the Director of the Olin Observatory. In 2014, he became Head of the Department of Physics and Space Sciences at Florida Institute of Technology, until his departure in July 2020.

== Contributions ==
=== Astrophysics ===
Batcheldor's work includes the quantification of selection effects in the M–σ relation., the demonstration of low signal-to-noise data in published supermassive black holes mass estimates as well as comparative supermassive black holes mass measurements, and the discovery of a spatially offset supermassive black hole in the galaxy Messier 87.

=== Instrumentation ===
Batcheldor led the efforts to calibrate the NICMOS instrument on board the Hubble Space Telescope to enable imaging polarimetry at the level of 1%.

In 2012 he began efforts to bring back to operational status the 1.0-m Jacobus Kapteyn Telescope that had been taken out of service in 2003. This facility is now a remote observatory operated by the Southeastern Association for Research in Astronomy (SARA). Batcheldor is the principal investigator for the SpectraCAM charge injection device payload that was tested on the Nanoracks External Platform on the International Space Station.

=== Publications ===
Batcheldor is author of Astronomy Saves the World: Securing our Future Through Exploration and Education (ISBN 0997247509, ISBN 978-0997247503) that advocates for the introduction of astronomy as part of the core K-12 curriculum.
