= The Zoist =

Academic journal devoted to pseudoscientific concepts

- Discipline: Mesmerism, phrenology
- Language: English
- Edited by: John Elliotson, William Collins Engledue

Publication details
- History: 1843–1856
- Frequency: Quarterly

Standard abbreviations
- ISO 4: Zoist

The Zoist: A Journal of Cerebral Physiology & Mesmerism, and Their Applications to Human Welfare was a British journal, devoted to the promotion of the theories and practices (and the collection and dissemination of reports of the applications) of the pseudoscientific concepts of mesmerism and phrenology, and the enterprise of "connecting and harmonizing practical science with little understood laws governing the mental structure of man". With its name derived from the Greek word Zoe (ζωή) meaning "life". The Zoist was published quarterly, without a break, for fifteen years: from April 1843 until January 1856.

Edited by John Elliotson, the founder, and former president of the London Phrenological Society, who had been expelled from the University College Hospital in 1838 for his mesmeric practices, and William Collins Engledue, a former President of the British Phrenological Association, who was ostracized by both his medical colleagues for his dedication to mesmerism and phrenology, and by the majority of phrenologists for his rejection of their "socio-religious", spiritual position, in favour of a scientific, materialist, brain-centred position that, in effect, reduced mental operations to physical forces.

"The Zoist was a materialist journal; it repudiated metaphysics and argued that everything—including human thinking—could be explained through the laws of the physical universe ..."

== The journal ==
The Zoist's first edition was published in April 1843. The journal was printed on high quality paper, and issued quarterly to its subscribers, without a break, for fifteen years from April 1843 until January 1856. Each quarterly issue cost 2s.6d.

It was also published for a wider readership in annual volumes; and the first twelve annual volumes were published simultaneously by Hippolyte Ballière, in London, J.B. Ballière, in Paris, and T.O. Weigel, in Leipzig; the thirteenth and last volume was published by Arthur Hall, Virtue, and Co., in London.

Well-written in crisp, scientific English, it was devoted to the propagation of information about the applications of phrenology (rather than its theories) and to the collection, storage, and dissemination of reports of the therapeutic efficacy of applied mesmerism (with even less treatment of mesmeric theories than of phrenological theories). In part, it acted as a disciplinary clearing house for information and the experiences of both amateur and professional practitioners (and their subjects) from all over Great Britain, and its colonies; and it placed great stress on the well-demonstrated usefulness of mesmerism, not only in the alleviation of disease and suffering, but in the provision of pain-free surgery, especially amputations.

Over time, the journal concentrated more and more on mesmerism and less on phrenology, due in part to the evolving interests of Elliotson and Engledue, but mainly due to the fact that phrenologists were contributing far fewer articles than were mesmerists.

=== Similar publications ===
Aside from the already established journal, The Phrenological Journal and Miscellany, which ran from 1823 to 1847, and The Phrenological Almanac, which ran from 1842 to 1845, published by the Glasgow Phrenological Society, there was Spencer T. Hall's The Phreno-Magnet and Mirror of Nature: A Record of Facts, Experiments, and Discoveries in Phrenology, Magnetism, &c., which lasted for eleven monthly issues (from February 1843 to December 1843), the short-lived Mesmerist: A Journal of Vital Magnetism, which only lasted for twenty weekly issues (from 13 May 1843 to 23 September 1843), The Annals of Mesmerism and Mesmero-Phrenology, which lasted for three monthly issues (from July 1843 to September 1843), and The People's Phrenological Journal and Compendium of Mental and Moral Science, published weekly, by the Exeter and London Phrenological Societies, for two years (1843 to 1844).

Then, to add to the mix, James Braid's definitive work on hypnotism, Neurypnology or The Rationale of Nervous Sleep, Considered in Relation with Animal Magnetism, Illustrated by Numerous Cases of its Successful Application in the Relief and Cure of Disease was released in July 1843.

== Cerebral Physiology & Mesmerism ==
The choice of the "Cerebral Physiology & Mesmerism" sub-title for their journal—rather than, that is, "Animal Magnetism & Phrenology"—is a measure of the pragmatic, materialist, "leading edge" proto-scientific orientation of both Elliotson and Engledue.

Their deliberately chosen term "cerebral physiology" (coined by Engledue) was entirely consistent with the original anatomy-centred term of "cranioscopy" (German, die Kraniometrie) chosen by the German neuroanatomist Franz Joseph Gall; and it was intentionally applied—rather than the (then) prevailing English, metaphysical, mind-centred term, "phrenology" coined by Thomas Forster (see Forster (1815) – to distinguish their own rational, sceptical, proto-scientific efforts in pursuit of a scientific understanding of (what would be termed, today) "brain science", from the superstitious "phrenology" (which was eventually universally dismissed as a flawed pseudoscience).

Similarly, their choice of term "mesmerism" was intentionally applied to indicate that, whilst they were deeply committed to a scientific ratification, and neurophysiological investigation of the phenomena supposedly produced by mesmeric methods, their interest was almost exclusively in the consequences of the applications of the practices of Franz Mesmer, rather than paying any particular attention to the wide range of metaphysical theories of the "animal magnetists".

== Scope ==
Apart from providing literature reviews and announcements of new publications, The Zoist was a source of information, disciplinary interaction, original accounts of phenomena, relevant case studies of its application to wide range of conditions, ranging from epilepsy, stammering, and headache, to torticollis, asthma, and rheumatism, and extensive reports of pertinent innovations and discoveries.

Elliotson was an opponent of capital punishment, and argued, within the Zoist, based upon his phrenological analysis of the heads of executed murderers, that not only was phrenology true, but also that, from this, capital punishment was futile as a deterrent.

According to historian Alan Gauld (1992, pp. 219–243), apart from its concentration on mesmerism and phrenology, The Zoist was one of the principal sources for information, discussion, and education in the following domains of interest:

(1) Mesmeric Analgesia: although The Zoist would become the major vehicle for the (post-1846) reports of James Esdaile's work in India, it completely ignored the extensive (early 1842) work reported by Braid in his Neurypnology (1843, p. 253). Elliotson had already published his Numerous Cases of Surgical Operations without Pain in early 1843.
(2) Phreno-mesmerism (a.k.a. phreno-magnetism) and hemicerebral mesmerism (the mesmerization of each hemisphere of the brain separately).
(3) "Reichenbach phenomena" and other matters.
(4) Electro-biology and related matters.
(5) Alleged instances of extra-sensory perception (ESP) occurring in a mesmeric context.

According to the medical historian George Rosen (1946, p. 535):

In accordance with its avowed purpose, the Zoist presented articles on phrenology and mesmerism. Many papers were contributed by Elliotson who was a constant writer in the journal. The purpose of these communications was essentially propagandistic. For the most part they comprised reports on patients treated with mesmerism, testimonials and endorsements from physicians and satisfied patients, and polemics with opponents of mesmerism.
In addition, the Zoist also concerned itself with social problems, such as housing, crime, and education.
The views expressed on these questions were based generally on phrenological theory; and it is worthy of note that these views were very progressive.
Thus, opposition to capital punishment was forcibly expressed on several occasions, and demands were raised for the mental examination of criminals…
An article bearing the title "Physical Well-being, a necessary preliminary to Moral and Intellectual Progression" emphatically drew attention to the evils arising from lack of sanitation and overcrowding in the homes of the working masses.
The ill effects of poor housing in terms of premature mortality were pointed out and a demand made for better housing.
In the field of education, the Zoist insisted on the need for a national educational system: "Education is the proper remedy for crime, and there ought to be a national system of education, apart from religious belief and sectarian influence."

== Influence ==
Unlike France, where the conflict between the conventional medical establishment and the advocates of mesmerism took place in the public/political arena, the British debate between the conventional medical establishment and the scientific advocates of mesmerism, such as Elliotson and Engledue, took place mainly in the medical literature on the one hand (such as Wakley's Lancet), and The Zoist on the other.

Given Wakley's implacable opposition to Elliotson, it is not surprising that, from time to time, "The Lancet continued to fulminate against the mesmerists" maintaining that "all those connected with The Zoist were 'lepers', and doctors who practised mesmerism, traitors...".

== Stress on the power of the imagination ==
A constant aspect of The Zoist's approach was its stress on the power of the imagination. In January 1855, in an article summarizing the Zoist's extensive coverage of the issue over more than a decade, Elliotson wrote of how, "in mesmeric states the effect of imagination is far greater than in the ordinary state, and we suspect that in persons not in the mesmeric state, but who have been formerly mesmerised, the power is far greater than in those who have never been mesmerised".

== Contributions ==
Apart from Elliotson, Engledue, and an otherwise (at the time) unidentified constant contributor, operating under the nom de guerre of "L.E.G.E.", and apart from its exhaustive reports of the clinical and social applications of mesmerism and phrenology, and pain-free medical and dental surgery, and progress reports from the London mesmeric Infirmary, The Zoist featured an exceptionally wide range of items contributed by a wide range of contributors (many of whom remained anonymous) from Britain, the colonies, and the United States. For example:

- Three phrenological articles by Herbert Spencer: "A New View of the Functions of Imitation and Benevolence", "On the Situation of the Organ of Amativeness", and "A Theory concerning the Organ of Wonder".
- A poem written by Miss Anna Savage, reprinted from her recently released collection, Angel Visits (1845): "The Magnetic Sleeper".
- The publication of a previously unpublished paper, written by Thomas Symes Prideaux, esq. of Southampton in June 1839, which advocated using phrenology to select members of parliament (originally written for a "best essay" competition conducted in 1839 by the Phrenological Journal): "On the Application of Phrenology in the Choice of Parliamentary Representatives".
- Another poem from Miss Anna Savage, "suggested by the reply of a slave, who, on being asked to describe his feelings in the mesmeric state, answered, 'As I never felt before—free'.": "Verses by Miss Savage".
- A letter from Harriet Martineau describing her mesmeric treatment of a cow: "Mesmeric Cure of a Cow".
- A second letter from Harriet Martineau describing the angry visit of the veterinarian who had previously tried, in vain, to treat her dangerously ill cow (which was now quite well), on his hearing the news of its recovery: "Distressing effects in a Doctor upon the removal of a Disease from a Cow with Mesmerism".
- A contribution by Lieutenant Richard F. Burton, of Bombay: "Remarks upon a form of Sub-mesmerism, popularly called Electro-Biology, now practised in Scinde and other Eastern Countries".
- A communication from William John Tubbs, L.S.A. (London), M.R.C.S. (England), surgeon and mesmerist, of Upwell, Cambridgeshire to the effect that the son of John Tuck, labourer of Norfolk, and Elizabeth Tuck (née Rollins) had been christened "Mesmer":

Mesmeric Baptism.

Mr. Tubbs prevailed upon the parents of a baby to have it christened Mesmer.
"This is to certify that Mesmer, son of John and Elizabeth Tuck, of Outwell,
in the parish of Outwell, in the county of Norfolk, was born Dec. 18, 1850, and
baptized Feb. 3, 1851, by Thomas Charlton, minister of the Gospel.

"Given under my hand this 4th day of February, 1851."

- In response to a query from "A Patient", the editors of The Zoist, whilst assuring the enquirer that "we feel as much as he does the difficulty of procuring good mesmerisers", proceeded to set down a set of positive and negative selection criteria: "Choice of a Mesmeriser".
- Yet another poem, this time from Mrs Maria Abdy, widow of the late Rev. John Channing Abdy, M.A., of St. John's, Southwark: "The Mesmerist".

== The end of The Zoist ==
In a parting address to their journal's readers and subscribers written on 31 December 1855, the editors of The Zoist reminded their readers that they had sought "neither pecuniary gain nor worldly reputation", and had willingly undertaken the enterprise despite the fact that "loss was nearly certain", and that "contempt, ridicule, virulent abuse, and serious injury, were all inevitable".

Yet, they assured their readers, "the object for which The Zoist was undertaken"—namely, "the establishment of truths, splendid, exquisite, extensive in their bearings, and of the highest importance to the moral and corporeal well-being of mankind"—had been attained; and that it was their hope that it would "be regarded as a complete work which has come out in fifty-two numbers", and be recognized as "a rich store", and would be used as "a solid work of reference for years to come": see Gallery.

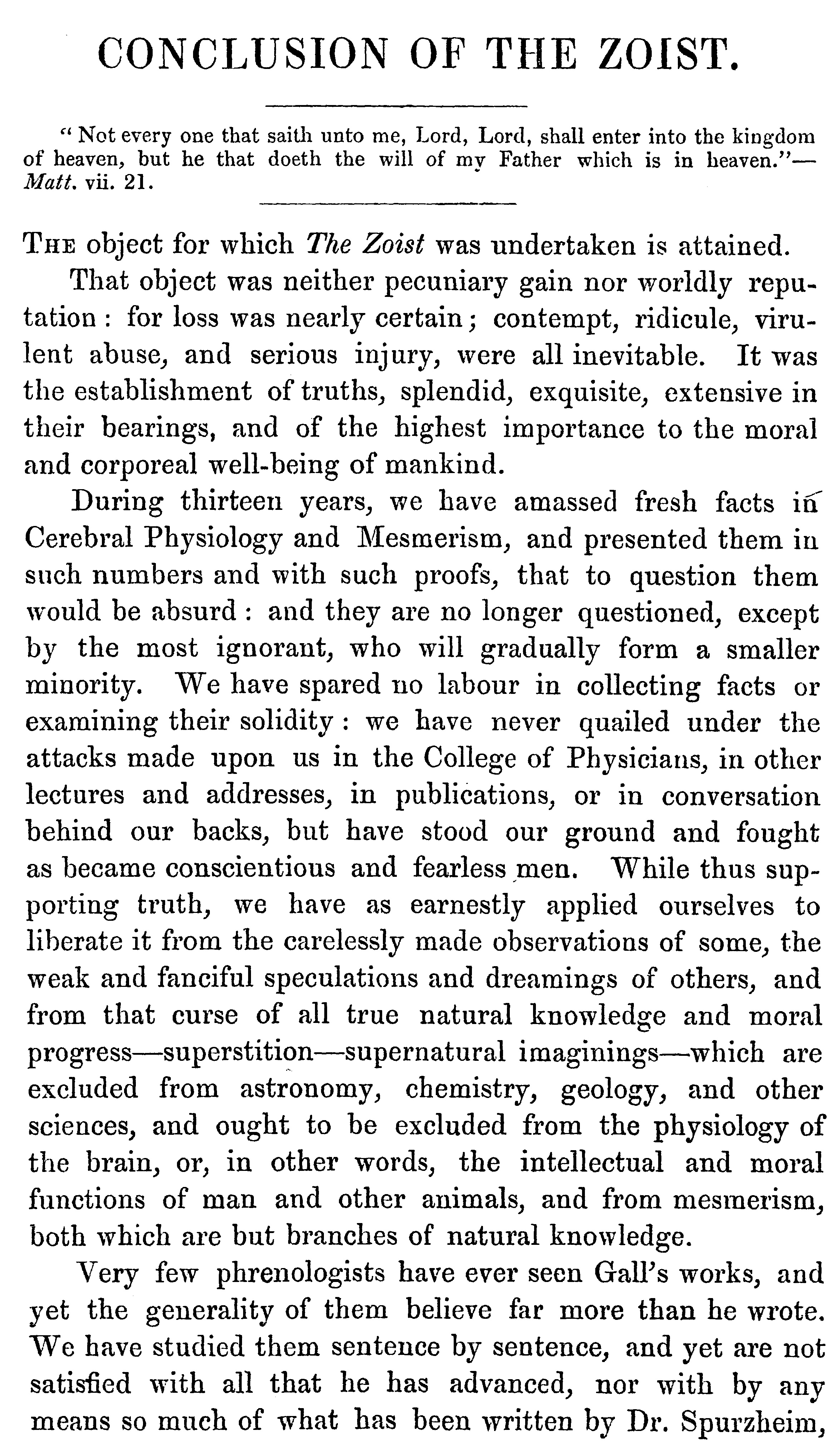
Final Remarks, p. 441

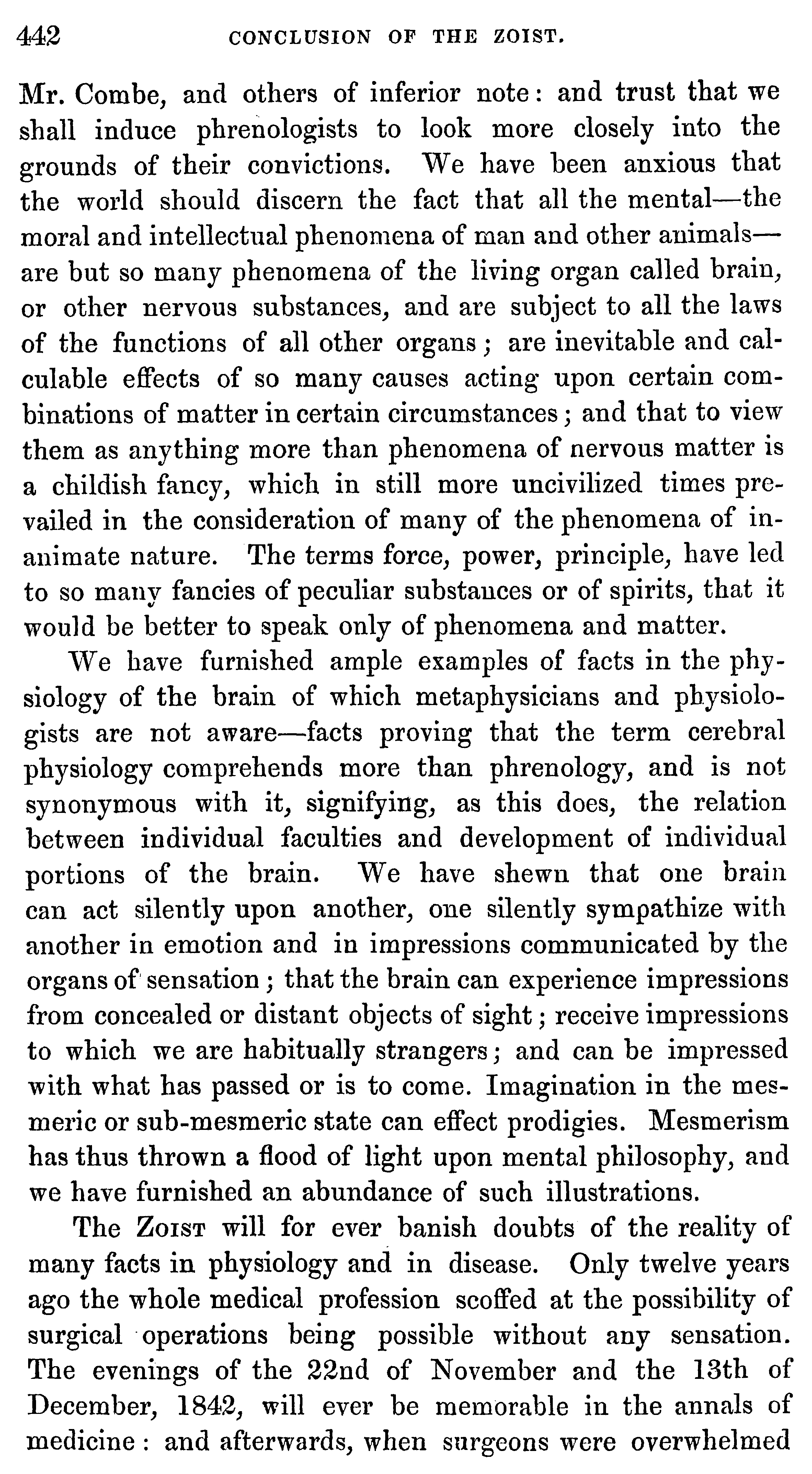
Final Remarks, p. 442

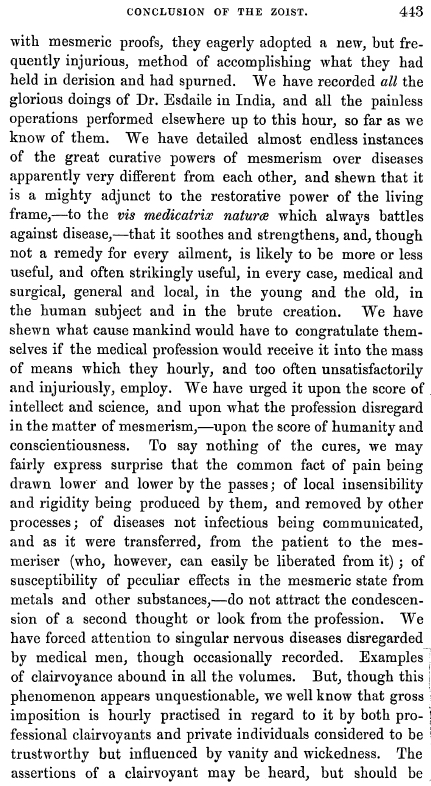
Final Remarks, p. 443

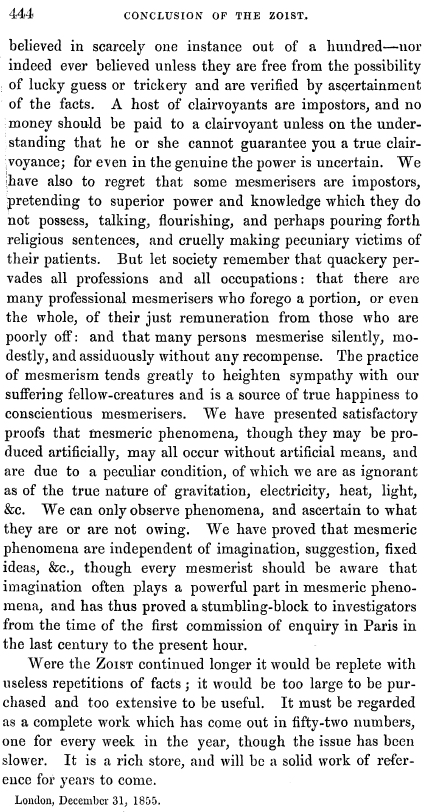
Final Remarks, p. 444
