= William Collins Engledue =

English physician, surgeon, apothecary, mesmerist, phrenologist and editor

- Born: 1813; Portsmouth, Hampshire, England
- Died: 30 December 1858 (aged 44–45); Southsea, Hampshire, England
- Education: University of Edinburgh
- Known for: Mesmerism, Phrenology, The Zoist
- Scientific career
- Fields: medicine

William Collins Engledue (1813 – 30 December 1858), MD (Edinburgh, 1835), MRCS (Edinburgh, 1835), MRCS (London, 1835), LSA (1835) was an English physician, surgeon, apothecary, mesmerist, phrenologist – and, in concert with John Elliotson, M.D., the co-editor of The Zoist.

A former President of the British Phrenological Association, Engledue was ostracized by both his medical colleagues – for his dedication to mesmerism and phrenology – and by the majority of phrenologists – for his rejection of their "socio-religious", spiritual position, in favour of a scientific, materialist, brain-centred position that, in effect, reduced mental operations to physical forces.

== Education ==
Born at Portsea in 1813, the son of John Engledue and Joanna Engledue (née Watson), he was a brilliant student. Sent to the University of Edinburgh by John Porter (1770–1855), (first president of the 'Portsmouth and Portsea Literary and Philosophical Society') to whom he was originally apprenticed, Engledue took his final exams after only two years study. At Edinburgh, he took prizes for proficiency in surgery, pathology and practice of physic, practical anatomy, and physiology; and was also the President of the Royal Medical Society of Edinburgh.

== Medical practice ==
Having spent a year as the anatomical demonstrator for John Lizars, Professor of Surgery to the Royal College of Surgeons of Edinburgh, he returned to Portsmouth in the winter of 1835, and started to practice there.

"He combined with a very extensive local general practice, a large share of the consultations both of the county, and also sometimes of the adjoining counties.

He was distinguished by a remarkably acute perception of diagnosis.
Having formed his opinion, he had great energy in acting on it: yet, though highly proficient in surgery, he invariably strove (sometimes it was thought with a doubtful daring) to save a limb rather than amputate it.
Marked by great energy of character, he was, nevertheless, distinguished by such gentle bearing, that he was the object of the intense affection of his patients – their friend and counsellor in the most difficult and trying circumstances; and he sacrificed his time, when most pressed and worried, to relieve their personal anxieties and sorrows.
His sense of professional etiquette, and his care for the interests of his brethren who were less gifted or less prosperous than himself, was delicate and acute.
One of the great features of his character was his loathing of sham or mystification in any shape.
If a disease ever puzzled him, he openly avowed it, and waited for further development; but in most cases, his clear perception and perspicuous explanation gave his patients a clear comprehension of their case.

This, perhaps, as much as his great talent, produced the unbounded confidence he acquired".

Greatly concerned with the conditions of the poor – prior to 1849, "he gave daily advice, gratuitously, in his own house [to] the large class of patients who were too poor to pay, and yet above seeking eleemosynary aid" – he spent much of his time trying to improve the purity of the water supply to Portsmouth. He was instrumental in the foundation of the Royal Portsmouth, Portsea, and Gosport Hospital in 1849; and, at the time of his death, he held the appointment of surgeon to the hospital.

== Cerebral physiology ==
A phrenologist, one-time President of the British Phrenological Association, his provocative (20 June 1842) presidential address, dealing with issues of phreno-mesmerism, the controversy of the day, in which he expressed the strong materialist views on phrenology, which were shared by Elliotson – who, incidentally, was the chairman of that particular session – led to Engledue's separation from that association.

To evade the charge of Materialism, said Dr. Engledue [in his address to the British Phrenological Association on 20 June 1842], we (Phrenologists) content ourselves with stating that the immaterial makes use of the material to show forth its powers.

What is the result of this?
We have the man of theory and believer in supernaturalism quarrelling with the man of fact and supporter of Materialism.
We have two parties; the one asserting that man possesses a spirit superadded to, but not inherent in, the brain – added to it, yet having no necessary connexion with it – producing material changes, yet immaterial – destitute of any of the known properties of matter – in fact an immaterial something which in one word means nothing, producing all the cerebral functions of man, yet not localised – not susceptible of proof; the other party contending that the belief in spiritualism fetters and ties down physiological investigation – that man's intellect is prostrated by the domination of metaphysical speculation – that we have no evidence of the existence of an essence, and that organised matter is all that is requisite to produce the multitudinous manifestations of human and brute cerebration.

We rank ourselves with the second party, and conceive that we must cease speaking of "the mind", and discontinue enlisting in our investigations a spiritual essence, the existence of which cannot be proved, but which tends to mystify and perplex a question sufficiently clear if we confine ourselves to the consideration of organised matter – its forms – its changes – and its aberrations from normal structure. (Charles Southwell, 1846)

Engledue was a strong advocate of mesmerism and, with John Elliotson, co-founded The Zoist; and remained its joint editor until publication ceased in 1856. While Elliotson had (possibly) performed the first medical procedure in the U.K. that had been rendered painless (and had been done without the patient being aware of the intervention) by mesmerism (on Elizabeth Okey in 1837), it is almost certain that Engledue performed the first undocumented surgery that had been rendered painless (and had been done without the patient being aware of the intervention) by mesmerism in August 1842.

Also, in his Cerebral Physiology and Materialism (1842) – the published text of his Presidential Address to the British Phrenological Association – Engledue introduced the concept of "cerebration" to designate the operation of the brain: a term that was later revived, in 1855, by William Benjamin Carpenter's "unconscious cerebration", which Carpenter offered as a more refined development of his earlier concept, the "ideo-motor principle of action" (and which he used to describe Braid's "Hypnotism" in 1852).

In 1858, Engledue delivered a well-received series of twelve lectures on "Human Physiology" on behalf of the three Literary societies of Portsmouth – the Athenæum, the Philosophical Society, and the Watt Institute – to an enthusiastic audience of more than a thousand on consecutive Monday evenings from 11 January 1858 to 28 March 1858:

"…at the request of the three literary Institutions of Portsmouth, [Engledue agreed] to give a course of twelve lectures on Human Physiology … in which he finely expressed the great object of the medical profession, to teach men how to avoid disease, rather than merely to cure it when contracted. The lectures were published in extenso in a Portsmouth paper, and afford evidences of a most comprehensive mind. Elegant and chastened as literary productions, they afford a copiousness of illustration, and a simplicity of explanation, rarely attained by a scientific lecturer".

The series was immediately followed by a single lecture on "Cerebral Physiology" (N.B., rather than "Phrenology") on 14 April 1858.

== The Zoist ==
Engledue and John Elliotson were the co-editors of The Zoist: A Journal of Cerebral Physiology & Mesmerism, and Their Applications to Human Welfare, an influential British journal, devoted to the promotion of the theories and practices (and the collection and dissemination of reports of the applications) of mesmerism and phrenology, and the enterprise of "connecting and harmonizing practical science with little understood laws governing the mental structure of man", that was published quarterly, without a break, for fifteen years: from March 1843 until January 1856.

The Zoist was printed on high-quality paper and issued quarterly to subscribers, and was also published in annual volumes for a wider readership. It focused on reporting applications of phrenology and on collecting and disseminating accounts relating to mesmerism. In this role, it served as a forum for information and experiences shared by both amateur and professional practitioners in Great Britain and its colonies. The journal included reports describing the use of mesmerism in medical contexts, including surgical procedures such as amputations.

== Suicide ==
Enledue "was a man of considerable eminence in the medical profession … and enjoyed a very extensive practice" in Portsmouth. In a state of deep melancholy consequent upon a nosocomial infection, namely erysipelas, acquired whilst hospitalized for surgery on an otherwise unremarkable small tumour, he took his own life in December 1858.

DR. WILLIAM ENGLEDUE, of Gloucester House, Southsea, a physician of considerable eminence, and having a very extensive practice in that neighbourhood, committed suicide on Thursday, December 30th, by swallowing a dose of prussic acid.
Dr. Engledue had, during the past fortnight, been confined to his residence with symptoms of derangement of the liver and other digestive organs, which had produced great taciturnity, even towards his family and his closest friends, and great depression of spirits.
Between seven and eight o’clock on Thursday morning, his sister, who resided with him, heard him moving about in his own chamber, and upon entering the room found that he had just thrown himself upon his bed, life being then, or soon afterwards, extinct.
Dr. Engledue was the younger brother of Capt. J. R. Engledue, Superintendent of the Peninsular and Oriental Steam Packet Company’s ships at Southampton.

During the coronial inquest into Engledue's death, conducted on Friday 31 December 1858, his personal physician of eight years standing, Robert Pennington Sparrow, MRCS (England), MRCP (Edinburgh), an ex-Naval surgeon, stated that Engledue's nosocomial infection was "erysipelas, followed by abscess"; and that its pain and discomfort were so severe that Engledue "had occasion to take large doses of opium to produce sleep" constantly during April, May and June. By July, he had ceased to need opium and, despite the fact that "he had not thoroughly recovered, and had not the physical strength to encounter what he was called upon to go through", Engledue resumed his medical practice at the beginning of July. He continued to practice up to and until 20 December, when he requested colleagues to take over his work-load.

At that time, given his diarrhoea and nausea, Sparrow had "persuaded him to lay up, telling him that he was killing himself with work", and, as Sparrow remarked to the coroner, whilst "persons labouring under the symptoms such as I have described the deceased to have suffered, are sometimes the victims of an uncontrollable suicidal impulse", he had formed the opinion that "the deceased's mental faculties were very much impaired", that "his mind was giving way, and that he was in a very different condition from what he had been in all his life before", and "was fearful of permanent insanity, rather than of any act of [suicide]". He also remarked that he had, therefore, come to the conclusion, that Engledue "was not in that condition which would induce me to recommend that his mother and sister keep a strict watch over him".

Sparrow made a point of emphasizing that there was nothing extraordinary about Engledue possessing prussic acid, because "bi-carbonate of potash (i.e., potassium bicarbonate) in combination with prussic acid (i.e., hydrogen cyanide) is frequently prescribed as a medicinal agent … in case[s] of nausea in the disease under which the deceased was labouring … and medical men frequently have recourse to it"; and, whilst stressing that he had not prescribed this mixture in Engledue's case, he also remarked that there would have been nothing remarkable about Engledue self-prescribing its administration. Engledue's local dispensing chemist gave evidence that he had supplied Engledue's written request for "specific quantities of solution of taraxacum (i.e., dandelion), tincture of gentium, bicarbonate of potash, together with three drachmes of prussic acid" three days earlier. The jury delivered the following verdict: "That the deceased died from the effects of prussic acid, taken with intent to destroy life, while in a state of unsound mind."

== External media ==
- Engledue’s (1835) M.D. graduation record: "Gulielmus C. Engledue, Anglus. What evidence do we have that the External Senses can be transferred to other parts of the body, as is said to occur in Somnambulism?" ("William C. Engledue, England") – University of Edinburgh (1867), p.103.
- Engledue's entry in the first edition of the British Medical Directory (1853) – The Lancet (1853)
- Engledue's entry in the second edition of the British Medical Directory (1854). – The Lancet (1854)
- Doctor W. C. Engledue, Chairman at the Banquet Held in September 1856 to Welcome Home Other Ranks from the Crimea, Proposing the Royal Toast: an 1856 painting by Portsmouth artist and photographer Richard Poate (1811–1878) – in the Collection of the Portsmouth City Museum
