= John Elliotson =

British medical doctor and mesmerist (1791–1868)

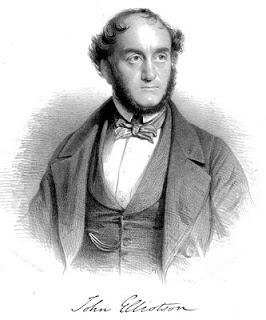
- John Elliotson
- Born: 29 October 1791; Southwark, London
- Died: 29 July 1868 (aged 76); London
- Education: University of Edinburgh
- Known for: Mesmerism, Phrenology, The Zoist, introducing stethoscope to United Kingdom
- Scientific career
- Fields: Medicine

John Elliotson (29 October 1791 – 29 July 1868), M.D. (Edinburgh, 1810), M.D.(Oxford, 1821), F.R.C.P.(London, 1822), F.R.S. (1829) was a British doctor who became known for his embrace of hypnotism. He was professor of medicine at University College London (1832), senior physician to University College Hospital (1834) — and, in concert with William Collins Engledue M.D., the co-editor of The Zoist. Elliotson was an author and teacher whose clinical practice and publications were noted by contemporaries. However, his advocacy for the practice of mesmerism were not without controversy.

He was always at the 'leading edge' of his profession: he was one of the first in Britain to use and promote the stethoscope, and one of the first to use acupuncture.

== Education ==
The son of the prosperous London chemist and apothecary John Elliotson and Elizabeth Elliotson, he was born in Southwark on 29 October 1791.

He was a private pupil of the rector of St Saviours, Southwark, and went on to study medicine at the University of Edinburgh, from 1805 to 1810 — where he was influenced by Thomas Brown, M.D. (1778–1820) — and then at Jesus College, Cambridge, from 1810 to 1821), from both of which institutions he took the degree of M.D., and subsequently in London at St Thomas' and Guy's hospitals. In 1831 he was elected professor of the principles and practice of physic in London University (now University College London), and in 1834 he became physician to University College Hospital.

== Physical characteristics ==
Barely 5 ft (152 cm) tall, with dark complexion and a very large head, he was also lame (following an 1828 carriage accident).

His appearance presented a strong contrast to his 'intramural enemy' Robert Liston (1794-1847), F.R.C.S. (Edinburgh, 1818), F.R.S. (1841), the University College's Professor of Clinical Surgery, one of the fastest surgeons of all time (on one occasion Liston amputated a leg, mid-thigh, in 25 seconds), who was pale skinned, and at least 6 ft 2in (188 cm) tall. Liston was fiercely opposed to Elliotson's 'contamination' of the hospital with his demonstrations of 'higher states' of mesmerism (i.e., rather than its 'medical' applications).

Despite his unusual physical characteristics, Elliotson was greatly admired as a lecturer, both for the structured clarity of his lectures, and the theatrical liveliness of their delivery. Once he began lecturing at the University College, his widely respected lectures were extensively reported in the medical press; and he published a number of collections of his lectures over the years. At his peak, he was the first President of the Royal Medical and Chirurgical Society (in 1833), a fellow of the Royal College of Physicians and the Royal Society, he had one of the largest private practices in London and, at his peak, was one of the pre-eminent physicians in the entire British Empire.

== Phrenology and mesmerism ==
He became interested in phrenology, and was founder and first President of the London Phrenological Society (in 1823). His interest in mesmerism had been aroused initially by the demonstrations conducted by Richard Chenevix in 1829, and re-awakened by Dupotet de Sennevoy's demonstrations in 1837.

=== The Okey sisters ===
This prompted Elliotson to begin experimenting with the Okey sisters, Elizabeth (17) and Jane (15), who had been admitted to his hospital, in April 1837, for treatment of their epilepsy. Their surname was often given as O'Key and it was and is widely assumed they were Irish but in fact they came from an old English family (Okey comes from the oak tree). Elliotson soon began using them as subjects – in 1837 he inserted "a large seton needle with a skein of silk into it", entirely painlessly, and without her even being aware that such a penetration had taken place, into the neck of Elizabeth Okey (the older sister) whilst she was mesmerized — within the confines of the hospital, in public demonstrations of the so-called 'higher states' of mesmerism: clairvoyance, transposition of the senses (seeing with the fingers, etc.), thought transmission, physical rapport or "community of sensation", psychical rapport, etc. Convinced that the elder sister, Elizabeth, had a talent for medical clairvoyance (able to see into the body, diagnose illness, prescribe treatment, and deliver a prognosis), Elliotson took her down into the wards in the dead of night and had her both diagnose and prescribe treatments.

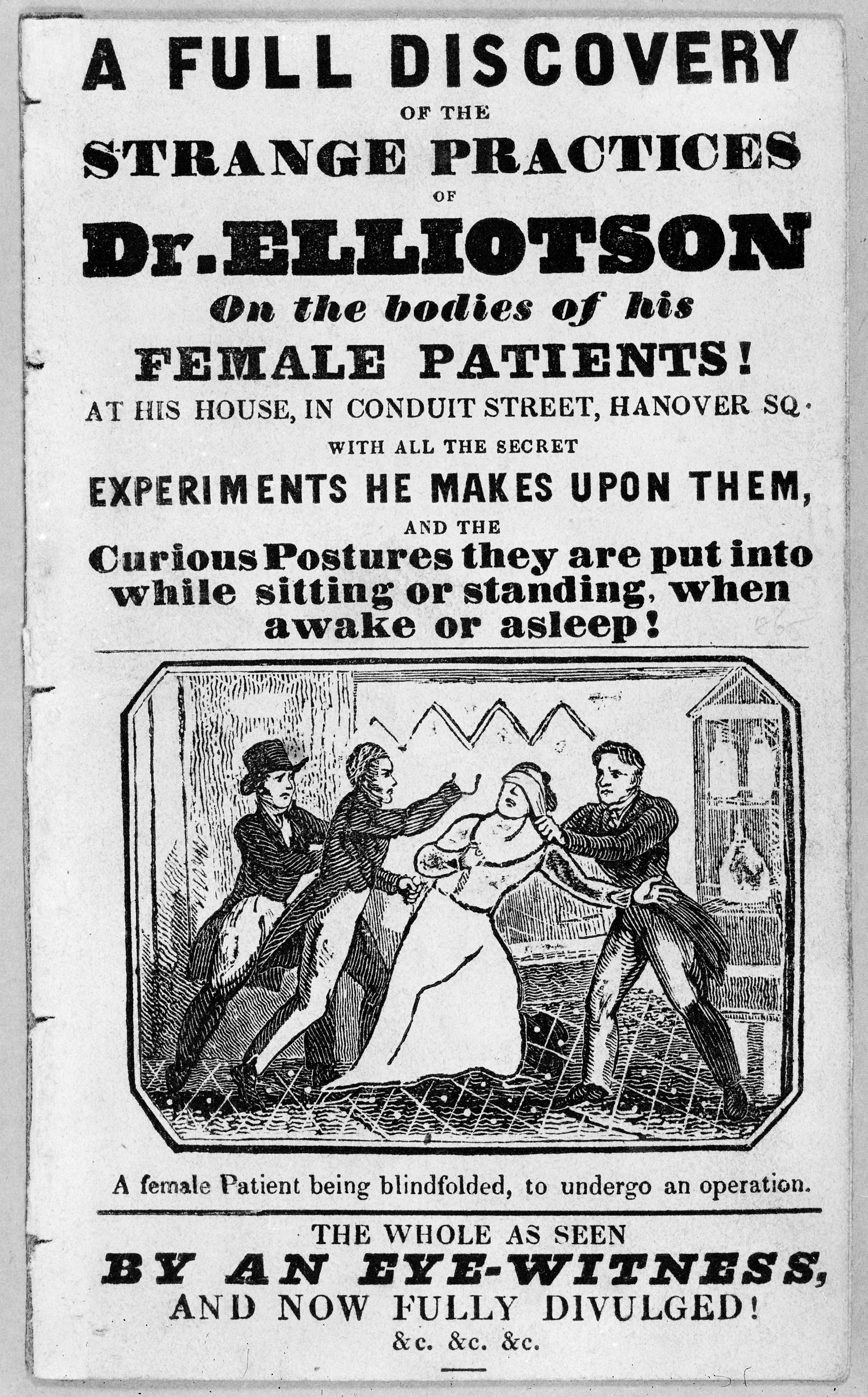
Anonymous anti-Elliotson pamphlet

=== Thomas Wakley ===
In August 1838, Thomas Wakley conducted a series of experiments on the sisters in front of several witnesses. His tests focussed on whether the girls could tell 'mesmerised' from 'unmesmerised' water. When they failed to do this consistently, he denounced them as frauds and proclaimed mesmerism a complete fallacy. In fact, the experiments did not prove the girls were faking nor did they show that mesmerism was false. By the end of 1838, however, Elliotson was forced to resign from the hospital. The Council of the University College, after months of deliberation, passed a resolution on 27 December 1838, "That the Hospital Committee be instructed to take such steps as they shall deem most advisable, to prevent the practice of Mesmerism or Animal Magnetism within the Hospital"; and Elliotson, on reading the contents of the resolution, resigned all of his appointments forthwith.

Wakley did all that he could, as editor of The Lancet, and as an individual, to oppose Elliotson, and to place all of his endeavours and enterprises in the worst possible light; for example, in addition to an extensive range of articles in The Lancet, over a number of years, there is also an anti-Elliotson (pseudonymous) work attributed to Wakley, Undeniable facts concerning the strange practices of Dr. Elliotson, ... with his female patients; and his medical experiments upon the bodies of ... E. & J. Okey, etc. (1842) which is held by the British Library, and another, most likely written by either Wakley or one of his associates, held in the collection of the Wellcome Library (see right).

== The Zoist ==
Elliotson and William Collins Engledue were the co-editors of The Zoist: A Journal of Cerebral Physiology & Mesmerism, and Their Applications to Human Welfare, an influential British journal, devoted to the promotion of the theories and practices (and the collection and dissemination of reports of the applications) of mesmerism and phrenology, and the enterprise of "connecting and harmonizing practical science with little understood laws governing the mental structure of man", that was published quarterly, without a break, for fifteen years: from March 1843 until January 1856.

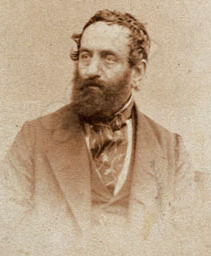
John Elliotson in his last years

The Zoist was issued quarterly to its subscribers. It was also published for a wider readership in annual volumes. It was devoted to the propagation of information regarding the applications of phrenology and to the collection, storage, and dissemination of reports of the therapeutic efficacy of mesmerism. In part, it acted as a disciplinary clearing house for information and the experiences of both amateur and professional practitioners (and their subjects) from all over Great Britain and its colonies, and it placed great stress on the beneficial effects of mesmerism, not only in the alleviation of disease and pain, but in the provision of pain-free surgery, especially amputations.

== Harveian Oration ==
In 1846 – by this stage bereft of all his institutional affiliations – and despite many earnest efforts made to prevent him doing so, as the Royal College of Physicians' youngest fellow, Elliotson delivered the Harveian Oration to the Royal College of Physicians of London, in which he controversially spoke of how William Harvey, the man whom the Oration was honouring, had been forced to fight against the entrenched conservatism of the medical profession and its initial incredulity and resistance to his discoveries, and stressed the strength of the analogy with the current (equally misguided and ignorant) critics of mesmerism.

"In 1846, Elliotson's turn came to deliver the Harveian Oration, but, as soon as it was known that he had accepted the office, he was attacked in the most savage manner, in order to prevent his appearing. For example, the Lancet called him a professional pariah, stated that his oration would strike a vital blow at legitimate medicine, and would be a black infamy degrading the arms of the College.

Undeterred by this, Elliotson made mesmerism the subject of his address. Without referring to the attacks which had been made upon him, he simply stated the result of his researches, and respectfully invited the College to examine alleged facts of overwhelming interest and importance.

He exhorted his hearers to study mesmerism calmly and dispassionately, and reminded them, with more truth than tact, that all the greatest discoveries in medical science, and the most important improvements in its practice, had been opposed by the profession in the most violent and unprincipled manner. As examples of scientific discoveries which had been received in this way, he cited those of the lacteal vessels, the thoracic duct, the sexual system of plants, the circulation of the blood, the sounds of the chest and their relation to the diseases of the heart and lungs and their coverings, etc. As instances of improvement in practice which had been treated in like manner, he referred to the employment of Peruvian bark, inoculation and vaccination for small-pox, the use of mild dressings, instead of boiling oil, in gun-shot wounds, the ligature of the bleeding vessels after operation, instead of the application of burning pitch or red-hot irons, etc.

We should, Elliotson said, never forget these things, nor allow authority, conceit, habit, or the fear of ridicule to make us hostile to truth. We should always have before our eyes that memorable passage in Harvey's works: "True philosophers, compelled by the love of truth and wisdom, never fancy themselves so wise and full of sense as not to yield to truth from any source and at all times: nor are they so narrow-minded as to believe any art or science has been handed down in such a state of perfection to us by our predecessors that nothing remains for future industry."

All this, Elliotson said, should be borne in mind when considering the alleged facts of mesmerism. In his opinion many of these were indisputable; for ten years he had shown how mesmerism could prevent pain during surgical operation, produce sleep and ease in sickness, and even cure many diseases which had been unrelieved by ordinary methods. It was the imperative and solemn duty of the profession to carefully and dispassionately examine the subject.

He therefore earnestly implored them to do so, if they cared for truth, their own dignity, and the good of mankind." — John Milne Bramwell (1903)

== Mesmeric Infirmary ==
Elliotson continued to provide mesmeric demonstrations from his own residence at 37 Conduit Street, Hanover Square (which he eventually quit in 1865). In partnership with Engledue, he began publishing The Zoist in 1843, and, in 1849 founded the London Mesmeric Infirmary. As his reputation rapidly declined, his once lucrative practice also disappeared, and he died, penniless, in 1868 in the London home of a medical colleague, Edmond Sheppard Symes (1805-1881), L.S.A. (1830), M.R.C.S (England, 1832), M.D. (Aberdeen, 1851).

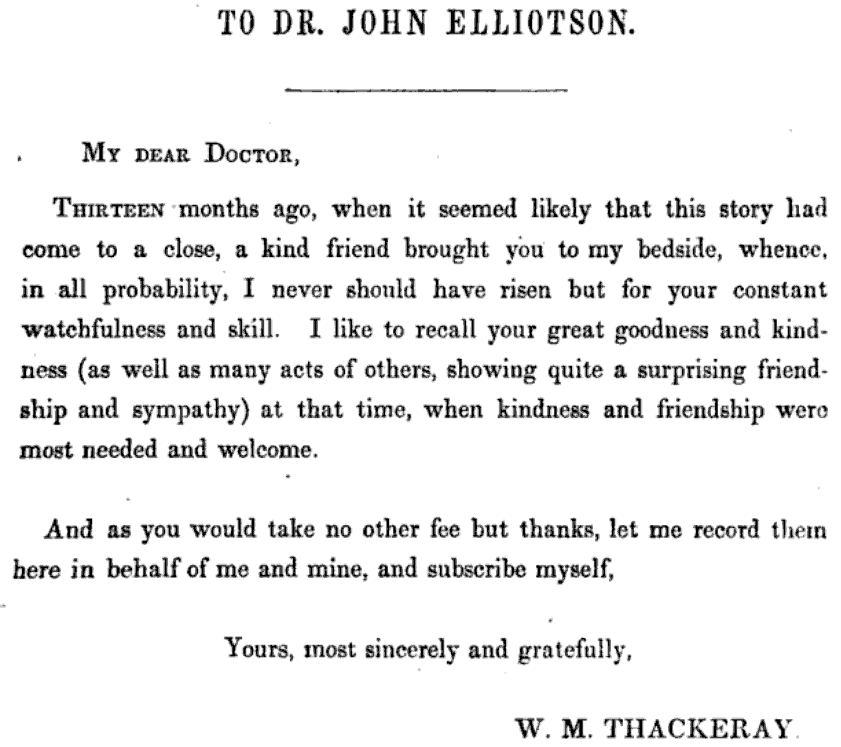
William Makepeace Thackeray's dedication to John Elliotson in the novel The History of Pendennis (1850)

"Elliotson firmly believed that mesmerism and phreno-mesmerism could be explained fully in physical terms [and, of] all Elliotson's achievements, The Zoist is probably the most useful, mainly because it provides a detailed record of a crucial thirteen year period in the development of Victorian psychology.

Elliotson was a relentless advocate for his "truth." His articulateness as a writer and his energy as an editor almost triumph over the limitations of his vision and the demands of advocacy … The wonder is that in the face of so much criticism Elliotson was able to maintain as much objectivity and professional rigor as he did, though clearly the pages of The Zoist need to be filtered carefully to distinguish what is of value from what is sheer advocacy and contentiousness … Elliotson made three important contributions to the history of psychology and medicine.

By stressing the physical basis of mesmeric phenomena and its underlying causes in so far as they had therapeutic potential, he demonstrated that mesmerism could be used effectively in illnesses associated with the nervous system and as an anaesthesia in surgical procedures. Elliotson's approach to the mind was through the body …

In addition, Elliotson was the first to attempt to detach the operations of mesmerism and the conditions of the procedure from conscious acts of will on the part of the subject and the operator, the patient and the doctor … In his appreciation of the non-rational and non-conscious elements within the procedure, [he] gave some direction and encouragement to those forces … that were laying the groundwork for Freud and other exponents of the relationship between the unconscious and psychiatric therapy.

Finally, Elliotson's imposing mid-century presence and his widely reported mesmeric activities provided both the degree of legitimacy and the intellectual stimulation that encouraged James Braid, a Manchester surgeon, to develop his theories on the role of suggestion and auto-suggestion in mesmerism". — Fred Kaplan (1982)

== Literary connections ==
He was highly regarded in literary circles. WM Thackeray's Pendennis was dedicated to his friend, Elliotson; and the character, Dr Goodenough (in Thackeray's last novel, The Adventures of Philip (1862), was based on Elliotson, who had attended Thackeray when he suffered a life-threatening illness in 1849.

Elliotson was a friend of Charles Dickens, and introduced Dickens to Mesmerism. Wilkie Collins, a close friend of Dickens described Elliotson as "one of the greatest English physiologists," and cites an example of state-dependent memory from Elliotson's Human Physiology in The Moonstone.

== Works ==
- 1817: Elliotson, J. (trans.), Blumenbach, J.F., The Institutions of Physiology (Institutiones Physiologicæ.
- 1820: Elliotson, J., Numerous Cases Illustrative of the Efficacy of the Hydrocyanic Or Prussic Prussic Acid in Affections of the Stomach., etc., Longman, Hurst, Rees, Orme, and Brown, (London), 1820.
- 1827: Elliotson, J., "The Use of the Sulphate of Copper in Chronic Diarrhoea, to which are added some Observations on the use of Acupuncture in Rheumatism", Medico-Chirurgical Transactions, Vol.13, Part 2, (1827), pp. 451–468.
- 1830: Elliotson, J., On the Recent Improvements in the Art of Distinguishing the Various Diseases of the Heart, etc., Longman, Rees, Orme, Brown, and Green, (London), 1830.
- 1832: Elliotson, J., "Acupuncture", pp. 32–34 in Forbes, J., Tweedie, A. & Conolly, J. (eds), The Cyclopædia of Practical Medicine: Comprising Treatises on the Nature and Treatment of Diseases, Materia Medica and Therapeutics, Medical Jurisprudence, etc. etc., Volume I (Abd-Ele), Sherwood, Gilbert, and Piper, (London), 1832.
- 1835: Elliotson, J., Human Physiology, Longman, Rees, Orme, Brown, Green & Longman, (London), 1835.
- 1839: Elliotson, J. and Rogers, N., The Principles and Practice of Medicine, etc., Joseph Butler, (London), 1839.
- 1843: Elliotson, J., Numerous Cases of Surgical Operations without Pain in the Mesmeric state, with Remarks upon the Opposition of many Members of the Royal Medical and Chirurgical Society and others to the Reception of the Inestimable Blessings of Mesmerism, H. Ballière, (London), 1843.
- 1843: Engledue, W.C., Cerebral Physiology and Materialism, with the Result of the Application of Animal Magnetism to the Cerebral Organs: An Address delivered to the Phrenological Association in London, June 20, 1842, by W. C. Engledue, M.D.; With a Letter from Dr Elliotson, On Mesmeric Phrenology and Materialism, J. Watson, (London), 1843.
- 1844: Elliotson, J, "Case of Epilepsy Cured by Mesmerism", The Zoist: A Journal of Cerebral Physiology & Mesmerism, and Their Applications to Human Welfare, Vol.2, No.6, (July 1844), pp. 194–238.
- 1846: Elliotson, J., The Harveian Oration, Delivered before the Royal College of Physicians, London 1846, by John Elliotson, M.D. Cantab. F.R.S., Fellow of the College, With an English Version and Notes, (1846).
- 1855: Elliotson, J., "An Instance of Sleep and Cure by Imagination only", The Zoist: A Journal of Cerebral Physiology & Mesmerism, and Their Applications to Human Welfare, Vol.12, No.48, (January 1855), pp. 396–403.

== In popular culture ==
Elliotson is a major antagonist in the game Assassin's Creed: Syndicate, who performs brutal and fatal experiments on the insane at Lambeth Asylum and is a secret member of the Templar Order. He is later killed by the Master Assassin Jacob Frye.

== See also ==
- Animal magnetism – Pseudoscientific theory about force in living things
- Royal Commission on Animal Magnetism – 1784 French scientific bodies' investigations involving systematic controlled trials
- The Zoist: A Journal of Cerebral Physiology & Mesmerism, and Their Applications to Human Welfare – Academic journal devoted to pseudoscientific concepts
