= Sean Stephenson =

American therapist, author, and speaker (1979–2019)

- Born: May 5, 1979; Chicago, Illinois, U.S.
- Died: August 28, 2019 (aged 40); Scottsdale, Arizona, U.S.
- Cause of death: Concussion
- Education: DePaul University
- Occupations: Therapist; Author; Motivational speaker
- Height: 3 ft (91 cm)
- Spouse: Mindie Kniss (m. 2012)
- Website: SeanStephenson.com

Sean Clinch Stephenson (May 5, 1979 – August 28, 2019) was an American therapist, self-help author and motivational speaker. Because he was born with osteogenesis imperfecta, Stephenson stood three feet tall, had fragile bones, and used a wheelchair.

== Early life ==
When Stephenson was born, doctors quickly recognized the signs of the genetic mutation osteogenesis imperfecta, commonly known as "brittle bone disease". Most of his bones had been broken during the delivery. He was placed in intensive care at Chicago Children's Hospital, and doctors warned his parents that he might die very soon. He survived, but spent much of his youth in pain and experienced the stunted growth and mobility limitations common for people with osteogenesis imperfecta.

== Education and career ==
Stephenson began delivering motivational speeches at the age of 17. With the assistance of the Make-A-Wish Foundation, in 1998 Stephenson met his motivational speaking hero, Tony Robbins. Robbins became his mentor and encouraged him to change his lifestyle to improve his health. While attending DePaul University, Stephenson worked as an intern for President Bill Clinton and for Illinois Congressman Bill Lipinski. After receiving his bachelor's degree in political science in 2001 from DePaul University, he published his first book, How You(th) Can Succeed!: Transforming Dreams into Reality for Young Adults, and returned to motivational speaking.

After his speeches, Stephenson found he was often approached by people seeking advice on personal issues. Feeling ill-equipped to advise them, he decided to go back to school and become certified as a therapist. He took courses at Bennett/Stellar University, a private institution specializing in neuro-linguistic programming and hypnotherapy, and at American Pacific University (since renamed Kona University). In March 2004, Stephenson began work on a doctor of clinical hypnotherapy degree at American Pacific. He operated a therapy practice from offices in Oakbrook Terrace, Illinois. He also continued to work as a motivational speaker, earning US$15,000 to US$30,000 per appearance.

His second book, Get Off Your "But": How to End Self-Sabotage and Stand Up for Yourself, was published in 2009. It was a self-help book that recounted his own personal story along with the stories of others, and provided exercises for readers to perform while they read. Tony Robbins provided a foreword. That same year, Stephenson was the subject of Three Foot Giant, a television documentary that aired on The Biography Channel in November 2009.

== Personal life and death ==
Stephenson married Mindie Kniss in 2012. On August 28, 2019, Stephenson died after a serious concussion. His last words were "This happened for me. It didn't happen to me."

== Books ==
- How You(th) Can Succeed!: Transforming Dreams into Reality for Young Adults (2001)
- Get Off Your "But": How to End Self-Sabotage and Stand Up for Yourself (2009)
