= Convergent evolution =

Independent evolution of similar features

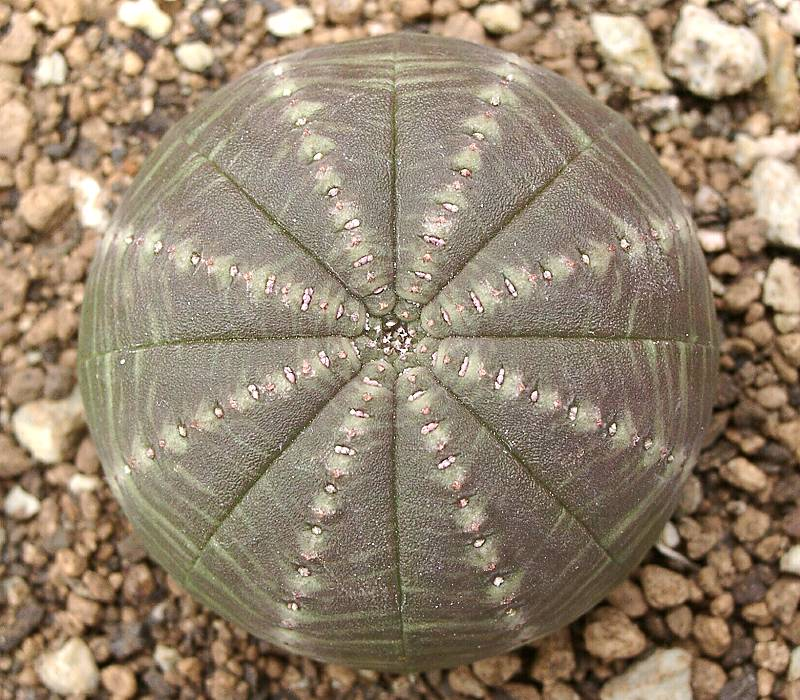
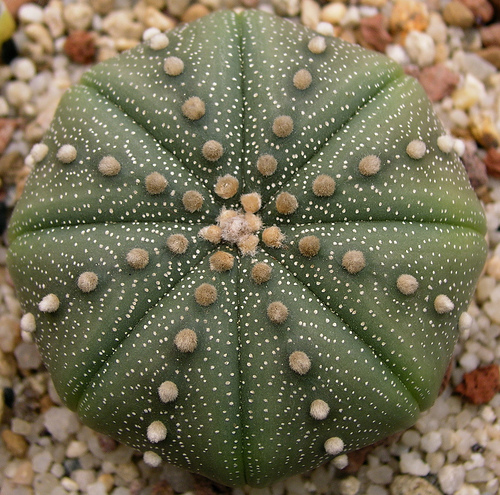
Two succulent plants, Euphorbia obesa ssp. symmetrica and Astrophytum asterias, are only distantly related, but they have converged on a similar body form.

Convergent evolution is the independent evolution of similar features in species of different lineages. Convergent evolution creates analogous structures that have similar form or function but were not present in the last common ancestor of those groups. The cladistic term for the same phenomenon is homoplasy. The recurrent evolution of flight is a classic example, as flying insects, birds, pterosaurs, and bats have independently evolved the useful capacity of flight. Functionally similar features that have arisen through convergent evolution are analogous, whereas homologous structures or traits have a common origin but can have dissimilar functions. Bird, bat, and pterosaur wings are analogous structures, but their forelimbs are homologous, sharing an ancestral state despite serving different functions.

The opposite of convergent evolution is divergent evolution, where related species evolve different traits. Convergent evolution is similar to parallel evolution, which occurs when two independent species evolve in the same direction and thus independently acquire similar characteristics; for instance, gliding frogs have evolved in parallel from multiple types of tree frog.

Many instances of convergent evolution are known in plants, including the repeated development of C_{4} photosynthesis, seed dispersal by fleshy fruits adapted to be eaten by animals, and carnivory.

== Overview ==
Homology and analogy in mammals and insects: on the horizontal axis, the structures are homologous in morphology, but different in function due to differences in habitat. On the vertical axis, the structures are analogous in function due to similar lifestyles but anatomically different with different phylogeny. (Note: However, evolutionary developmental biology has identified deep homology between insect and mammal body plans, to the surprise of many biologists.)

In morphology, analogous traits arise when different species live in similar ways and/or a similar environment, and so face the same environmental factors. When occupying similar ecological niches (that is, a distinctive way of life) similar problems can lead to similar solutions. The British anatomist Richard Owen was the first to identify the fundamental difference between analogies and homologies.

In biochemistry, physical and chemical constraints on mechanisms have caused some active site arrangements such as the catalytic triad to evolve independently in separate enzyme superfamilies.

In his 1989 book Wonderful Life, Stephen Jay Gould argued that if one could "rewind the tape of life [and] the same conditions were encountered again, evolution could take a very different course." Simon Conway Morris disputes this conclusion, arguing that convergence is a dominant force in evolution, and given that the same environmental and physical constraints are at work, life will inevitably evolve toward an "optimum" body plan, and at some point, evolution is bound to stumble upon intelligence, a trait presently identified with at least primates, corvids, and cetaceans.

== Distinctions ==
=== Cladistics ===
In cladistics, a homoplasy is a trait shared by two or more taxa for any reason other than that they share a common ancestry. Taxa which do share ancestry are part of the same clade; cladistics seeks to arrange them according to their degree of relatedness to describe their phylogeny. Homoplastic traits caused by convergence are therefore, from the point of view of cladistics, confounding factors which could lead to an incorrect analysis.

=== Atavism ===
It can be difficult to tell whether a trait has been lost and then re-evolved convergently, or whether a gene has simply been switched off and then re-enabled later. Such a re-emerged trait is called an atavism. From a mathematical standpoint, an unused gene (selectively neutral) has a steadily decreasing probability of retaining potential functionality over time. The time scale of this process varies greatly in different phylogenies; in mammals and birds, there is a reasonable probability of a gene's remaining in the genome in a potentially functional state for around 6 million years.

=== Parallel vs. convergent evolution ===
Evolution at an amino acid position. In each case, the left-hand species changes from having alanine (A) at a specific position in a protein in a hypothetical ancestor, and now has serine (S) there. The right-hand species may undergo divergent, parallel, or convergent evolution at this amino acid position relative to the first species.

When two species are similar in a particular character, evolution is defined as parallel if the ancestors were also similar, and convergent if they were not. (Note: However, all organisms share a common ancestor more or less recently, so the question of how far back to look in evolutionary time and how similar the ancestors need to be for one to consider parallel evolution to have taken place is not entirely resolved within evolutionary biology.) Some scientists have argued that there is a continuum between parallel and convergent evolution, while others maintain that despite some overlap, there are still important distinctions between the two.

When the ancestral forms are unspecified or unknown, or the range of traits considered is not clearly specified, the distinction between parallel and convergent evolution becomes more subjective. For instance, the striking example of similar placental and marsupial forms is described by Richard Dawkins in The Blind Watchmaker as a case of convergent evolution, because mammals on each continent had a long evolutionary history prior to the extinction of the dinosaurs under which to accumulate relevant differences.

== At molecular level ==
Evolutionary convergence of serine and cysteine protease towards the same catalytic triads organisation of acid-base-nucleophile in different protease superfamilies. Shown are the triads of subtilisin, prolyl oligopeptidase, TEV protease, and papain.

=== Proteins ===
==== Tertiary structures ====
Many proteins share analogous structural elements that arose independently across different genomes. There are several examples of convergent protein motifs sharing similar arrangements of structural elements. Whole protein structures too have arisen through convergent evolution.

==== Protease active sites ====
The enzymology of proteases provides some of the clearest examples of convergent evolution. These examples reflect the intrinsic chemical constraints on enzymes, leading evolution to converge on equivalent solutions independently and repeatedly.

Serine and cysteine proteases use different amino acid functional groups (alcohol or thiol) as a nucleophile. To activate that nucleophile, they orient an acidic and a basic residue in a catalytic triad. The chemical and physical constraints on enzyme catalysis have caused identical triad arrangements to evolve independently more than 20 times in different enzyme superfamilies.

Threonine proteases use the amino acid threonine as their catalytic nucleophile. Unlike cysteine and serine, threonine is a secondary alcohol (i.e. has a methyl group). The methyl group of threonine greatly restricts the possible orientations of triad and substrate, as the methyl clashes with either the enzyme backbone or the histidine base. Consequently, most threonine proteases use an N-terminal threonine in order to avoid such steric clashes. Several evolutionarily independent enzyme superfamilies with different protein folds use the N-terminal residue as a nucleophile. This commonality of active site but difference of protein fold indicates that the active site evolved convergently in those families.

==== Cone snail and fish insulin ====
Conus geographus produces a distinct form of insulin that is more similar to fish insulin protein sequences than to insulin from more closely related molluscs, suggesting convergent evolution, though with the possibility of horizontal gene transfer.

==== Ferrous iron uptake via protein transporters in land plants and chlorophytes ====
Distant homologues of the metal ion transporters ZIP in land plants and chlorophytes have converged in structure, likely to take up Fe^{2+} efficiently. The IRT1 proteins from Arabidopsis thaliana and rice have extremely different amino acid sequences from Chlamydomonas's IRT1, but their three-dimensional structures are similar, suggesting convergent evolution.

==== Na^{+},K^{+}-ATPase and Insect resistance to cardiotonic steroids ====
Many examples of convergent evolution exist in insects in terms of developing resistance at a molecular level to toxins. One well-characterized example is the evolution of resistance to cardiotonic steroids (CTSs) via amino acid substitutions at well-defined positions of the α-subunit of Na^{+},K^{+}-ATPase (ATPalpha). Variation in ATPalpha has been surveyed in various CTS-adapted species spanning six insect orders. Among 21 CTS-adapted species, 58 (76%) of 76 amino acid substitutions at sites implicated in CTS resistance occur in parallel in at least two lineages. 30 of these substitutions (40%) occur at just two sites in the protein (positions 111 and 122). CTS-adapted species have also recurrently evolved neo-functionalized duplications of ATPalpha, with convergent tissue-specific expression patterns.

=== Nucleic acids ===
Convergence occurs at the level of DNA and the amino acid sequences produced by translating structural genes into proteins. Studies have found convergence in amino acid sequences in echolocating bats and the dolphin; among marine mammals; between giant and red pandas; and between the thylacine and canids. Convergence has also been detected in a type of non-coding DNA, cis-regulatory elements, such as in their rates of evolution; this could indicate either positive selection or relaxed purifying selection.

== In animals ==
Dolphins and ichthyosaurs converged on many adaptations for fast swimming.

=== Bodyplans ===
Swimming animals including fish such as herrings, marine mammals such as dolphins, and ichthyosaurs (of the Mesozoic) all converged on the same streamlined shape. A similar shape and swimming adaptations are even present in molluscs, such as Phylliroe. The fusiform bodyshape (a tube tapered at both ends) adopted by many aquatic animals is an adaptation to enable them to travel at high speed in a high drag environment. Similar body shapes are found in the earless seals and the eared seals: they still have four legs, but these are strongly modified for swimming.

The marsupial fauna of Australia and the placental mammals of the Old World have several strikingly similar forms, developed in two clades, isolated from each other. The body, and especially the skull shape, of the thylacine (Tasmanian tiger or Tasmanian wolf) converged with those of Canidae such as the red fox, Vulpes vulpes.

Convergence of marsupial and placental mammals

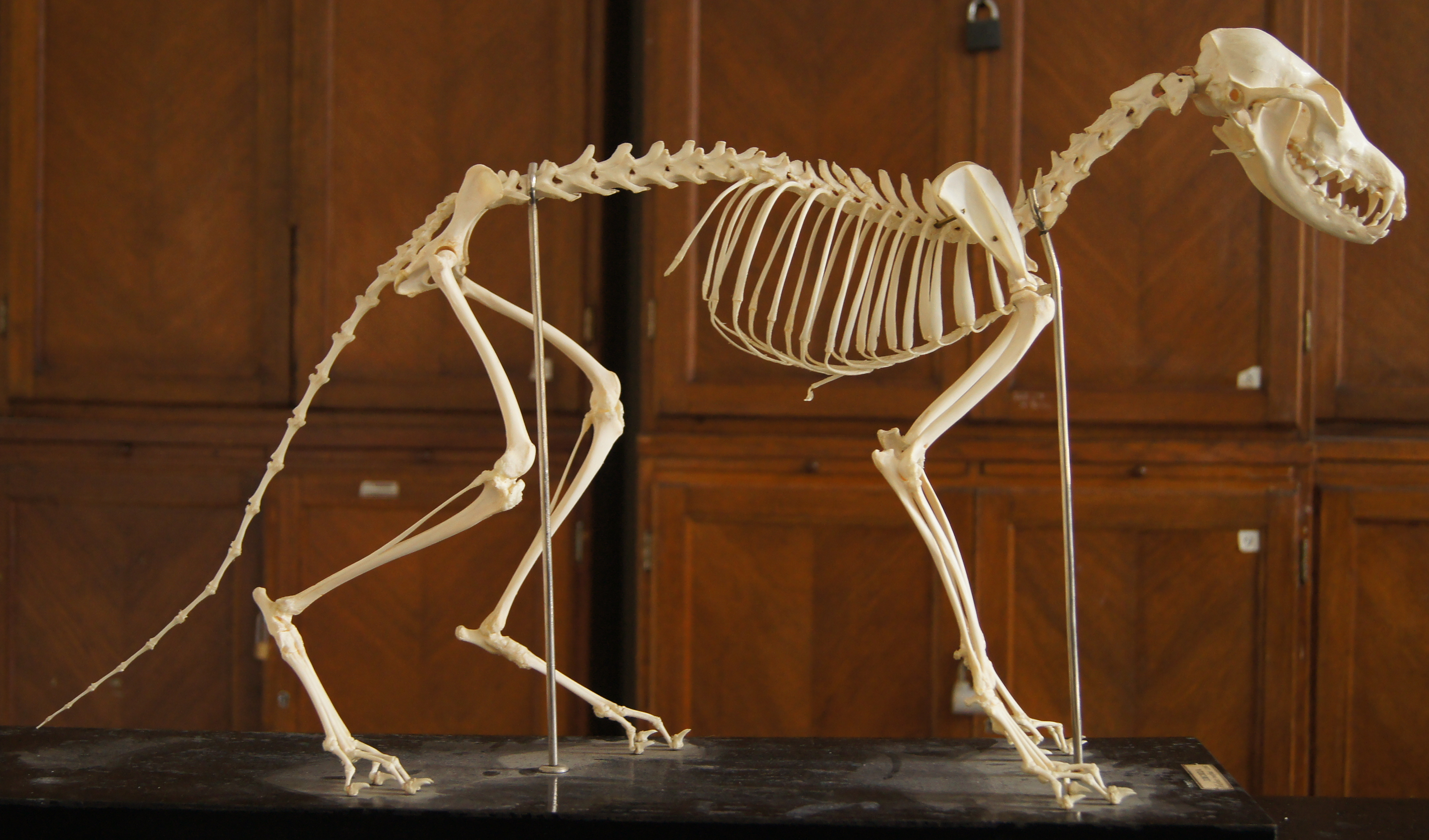
Red fox skeleton

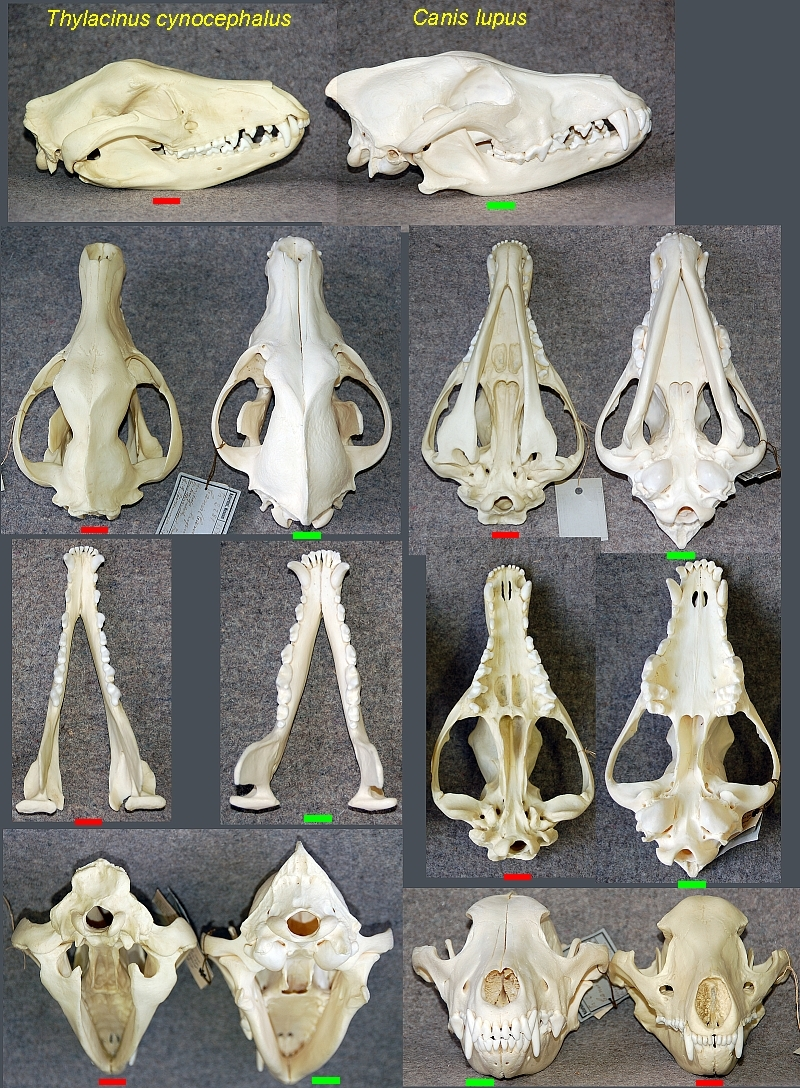
Skulls of thylacine (left), timber wolf (right)

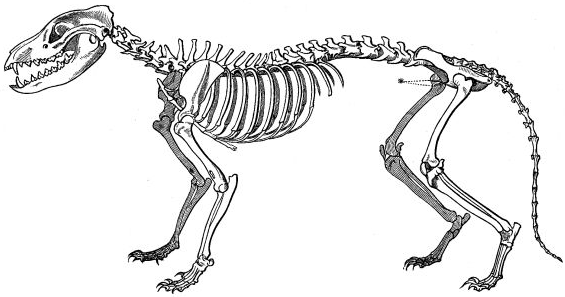
Thylacine skeleton

=== Echolocation ===
As a sensory adaptation, echolocation has evolved separately in cetaceans (dolphins and whales) and bats, but from the same genetic mutations.

=== Electric fishes ===
The Gymnotiformes of South America and the Mormyridae of Africa independently evolved passive electroreception (around 119 and 110 million years ago, respectively). Around 20 million years after acquiring that ability, both groups evolved active electrogenesis, producing weak electric fields to help them detect prey.

Convergence of weakly electric fishes

A gymnotiform electrolocation waveform

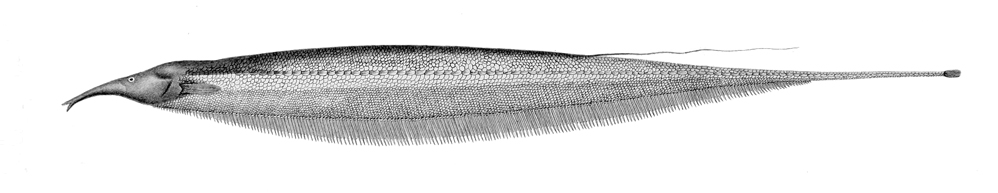
A gymnotiform electric fish of South America

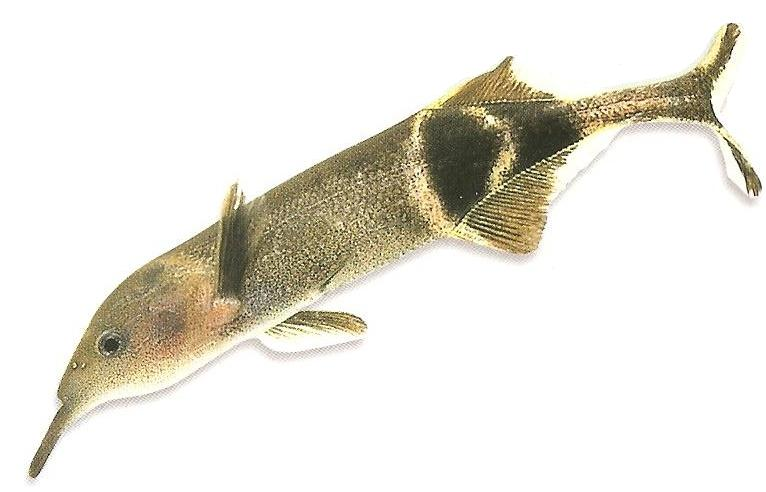
A mormyrid electric fish of Africa

A mormyrid electrolocation waveform

=== Eyes ===
The camera eyes of vertebrates (left) and cephalopods (right) developed independently and are wired differently; for instance, optic nerve ^{(3)} fibres ^{(2)} reach the vertebrate retina ^{(1)} from the front, creating a blind spot ^{(4)}.

One of the best-known examples of convergent evolution is the camera eye of cephalopods (such as squid and octopus), vertebrates (including mammals) and cnidarians (such as jellyfish). Their last common ancestor had at most a simple photoreceptive spot, but a range of processes led to the progressive refinement of camera eyes—with one sharp difference: the cephalopod eye is "wired" in the opposite direction, with blood and nerve vessels entering from the back of the retina, rather than the front as in vertebrates. As a result, vertebrates have a blind spot.

=== Sex organs ===
Hydrostatic penises have convergently evolved at least six times in male amniotes. In these species, males copulate with females and internally fertilize their eggs. Similar intromittent organs have evolved in invertebrates such as octopuses and gastropods.

=== Flight ===
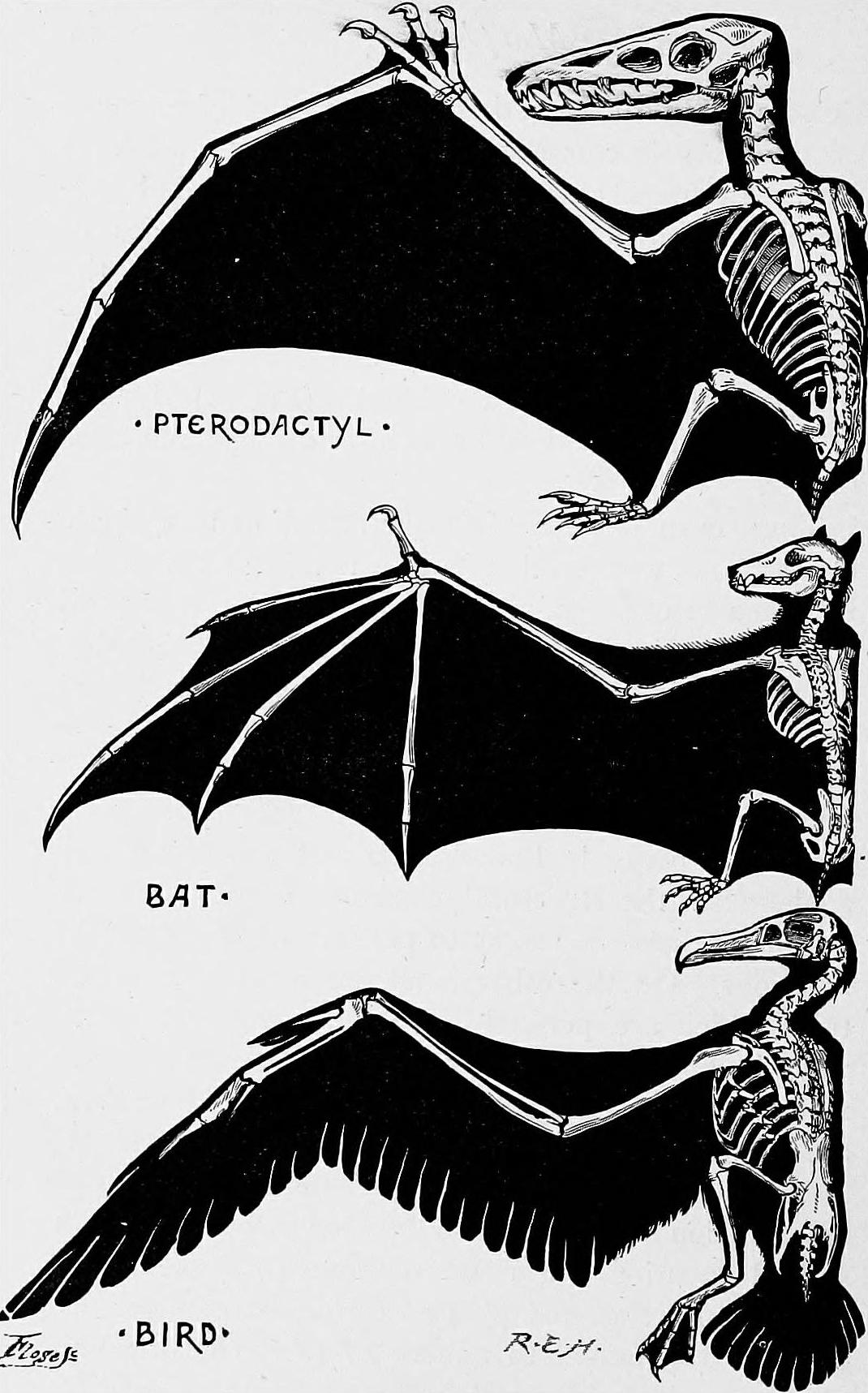
Vertebrate wings are partly homologous (from forelimbs), but analogous as organs of flight in (1) pterosaurs, (2) bats, (3) birds, evolved separately.

Birds and bats have homologous limbs because they are both ultimately derived from terrestrial tetrapods, but their flight mechanisms are only analogous, so their wings are examples of functional convergence. The two groups have independently evolved their own means of powered flight. Their wings differ substantially in construction. The bat wing is a membrane stretched across four extremely elongated fingers and the legs. The airfoil of the bird wing is made of feathers, strongly attached to the forearm (the ulna) and the highly fused bones of the wrist and hand (the carpometacarpus), with only tiny remnants of two fingers remaining, each anchoring a single feather. So, while the wings of bats and birds are functionally convergent, they are not anatomically convergent. Birds and bats also share a high concentration of cerebrosides in the skin of their wings. This improves skin flexibility, a trait useful for flying animals; other mammals have a far lower concentration. The extinct pterosaurs independently evolved wings from their fore- and hindlimbs, while insects have wings that evolved separately from different organs.

Flying squirrels and sugar gliders are much alike in their mammalian body plans, with gliding wings stretched between their limbs, but flying squirrels are placentals while sugar gliders are marsupials, widely separated within the mammal lineage from the placentals.

Hummingbird hawk-moths and hummingbirds have evolved similar flight and feeding patterns.

=== Insect mouthparts ===
Insect mouthparts show many examples of convergent evolution. The mouthparts of different insect groups consist of a set of homologous organs, specialised for the dietary intake of that insect group. Convergent evolution of many groups of insects led from original biting-chewing mouthparts to different, more specialised, derived function types. These include, for example, the proboscis of flower-visiting insects such as bees and flower beetles, or the biting-sucking mouthparts of blood-sucking insects such as fleas and mosquitos.

=== Intelligence ===
Advanced intelligence has evolved independently in cephalopods and vertebrates. Octopus have demonstrated mammalian levels of problem-solving, cognition, and learning behaviors. One aquarium director even claimed his octopus specimen to have developed a sense of personal taste as to the arrangement of its tank. Unlike other highly intelligent animals, cephalopods typically live short lives with varying levels of sociality, with the bulk of the nervous system divided between the head and limbs.

=== Opposable thumbs ===
Opposable thumbs allowing the grasping of objects are most often associated with primates, like humans and other apes, monkeys, and lemurs. Opposable thumbs also evolved in giant pandas, but these are completely different in structure, having six fingers including the thumb, which develops from a wrist bone entirely separately from other fingers.

=== Primate phenotypes ===
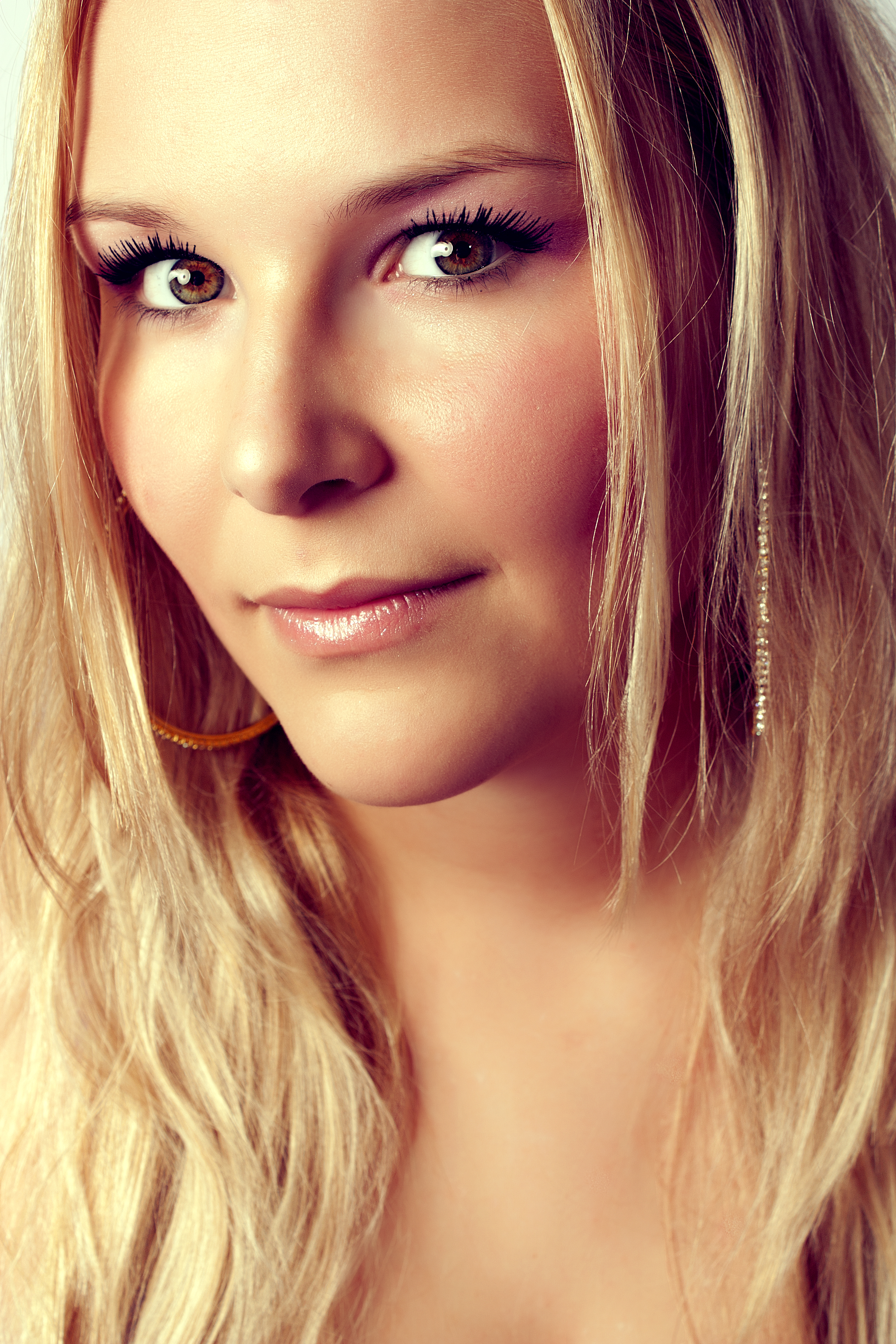

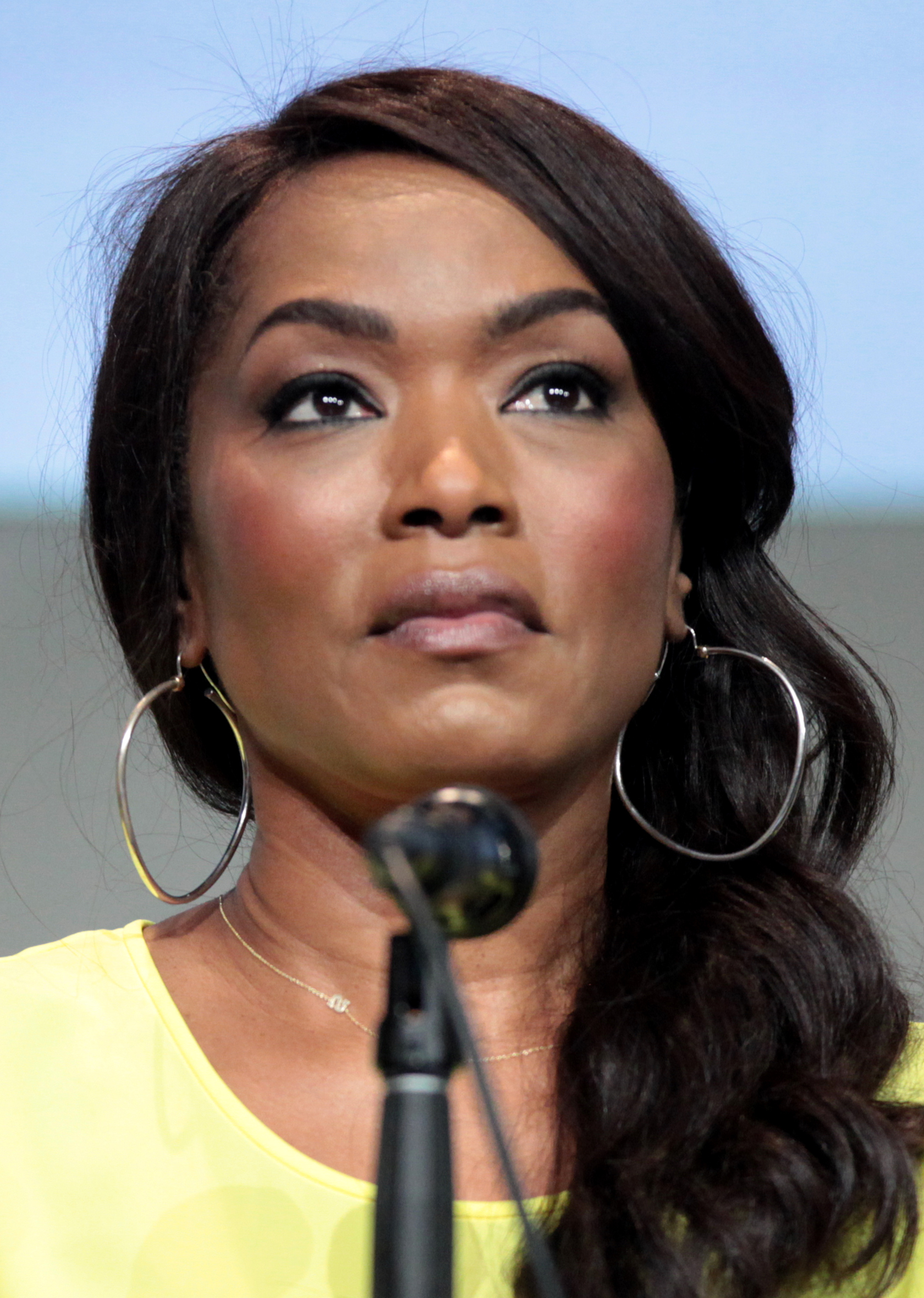

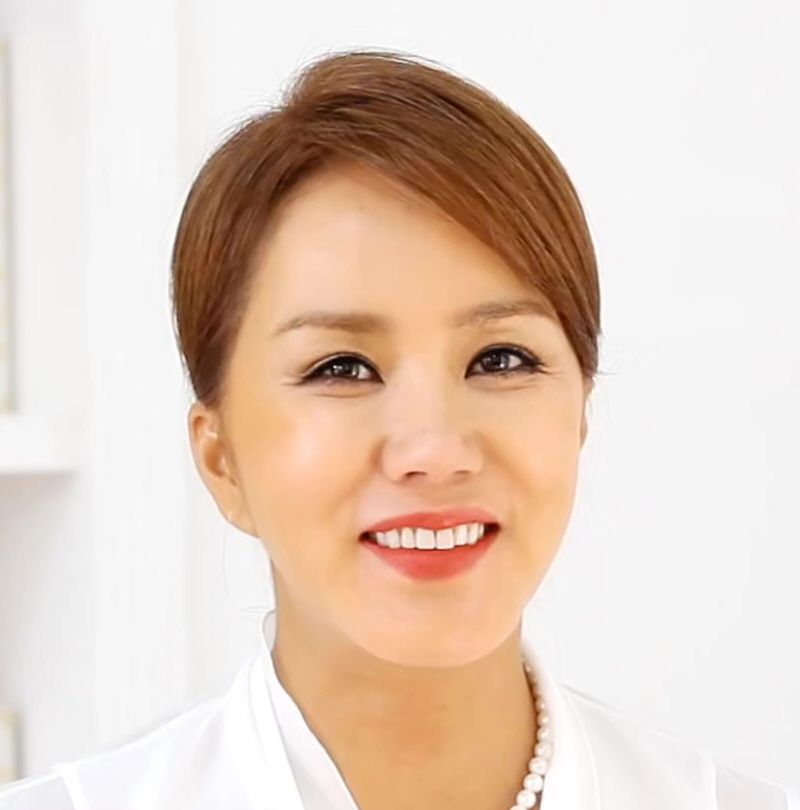

Despite the similar lightening of skin colour after moving out of Africa, different genes were involved in European (left) and East Asian (right) lineages.

Convergent evolution in humans includes blue eye colour and light skin colour. When humans migrated out of Africa, they moved to more northern latitudes with less intense sunlight. It was beneficial to them to have reduced skin pigmentation. It appears certain that there was some lightening of skin colour before European and East Asian lineages diverged, as there are some skin-lightening genetic differences that are common to both groups. However, after the lineages diverged and became genetically isolated, the skin of both groups lightened more, and that additional lightening was due to different genetic changes.

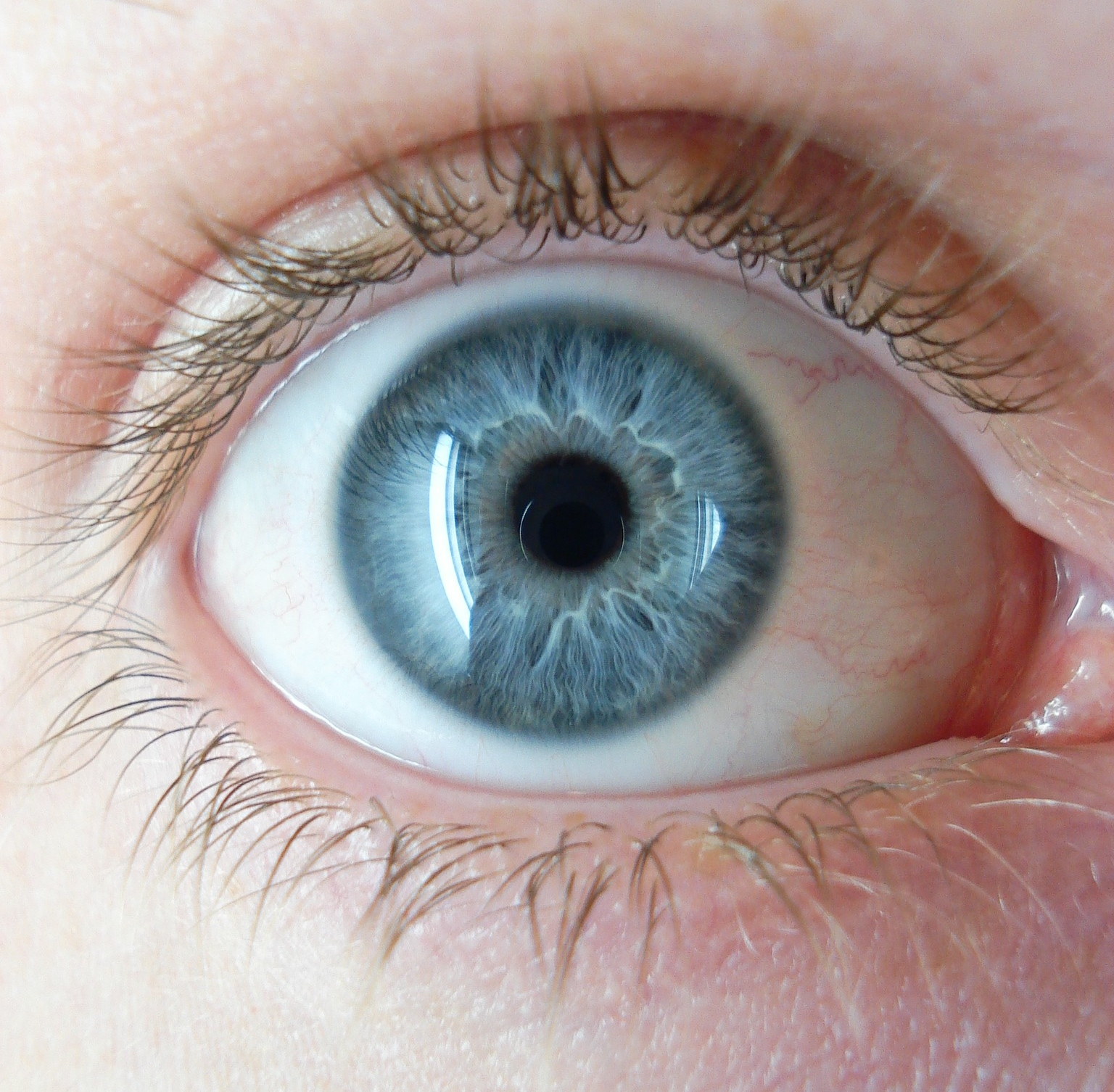
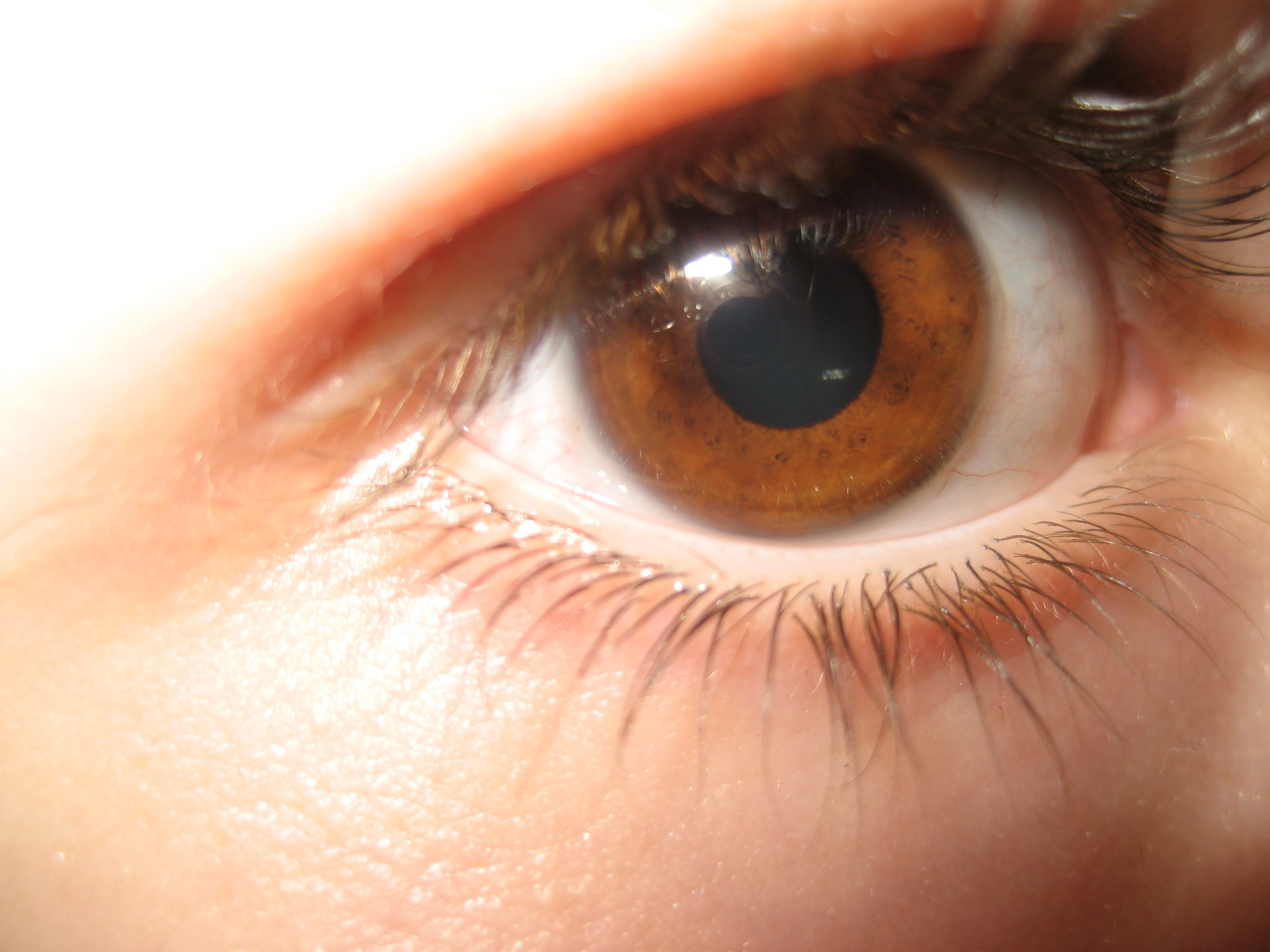
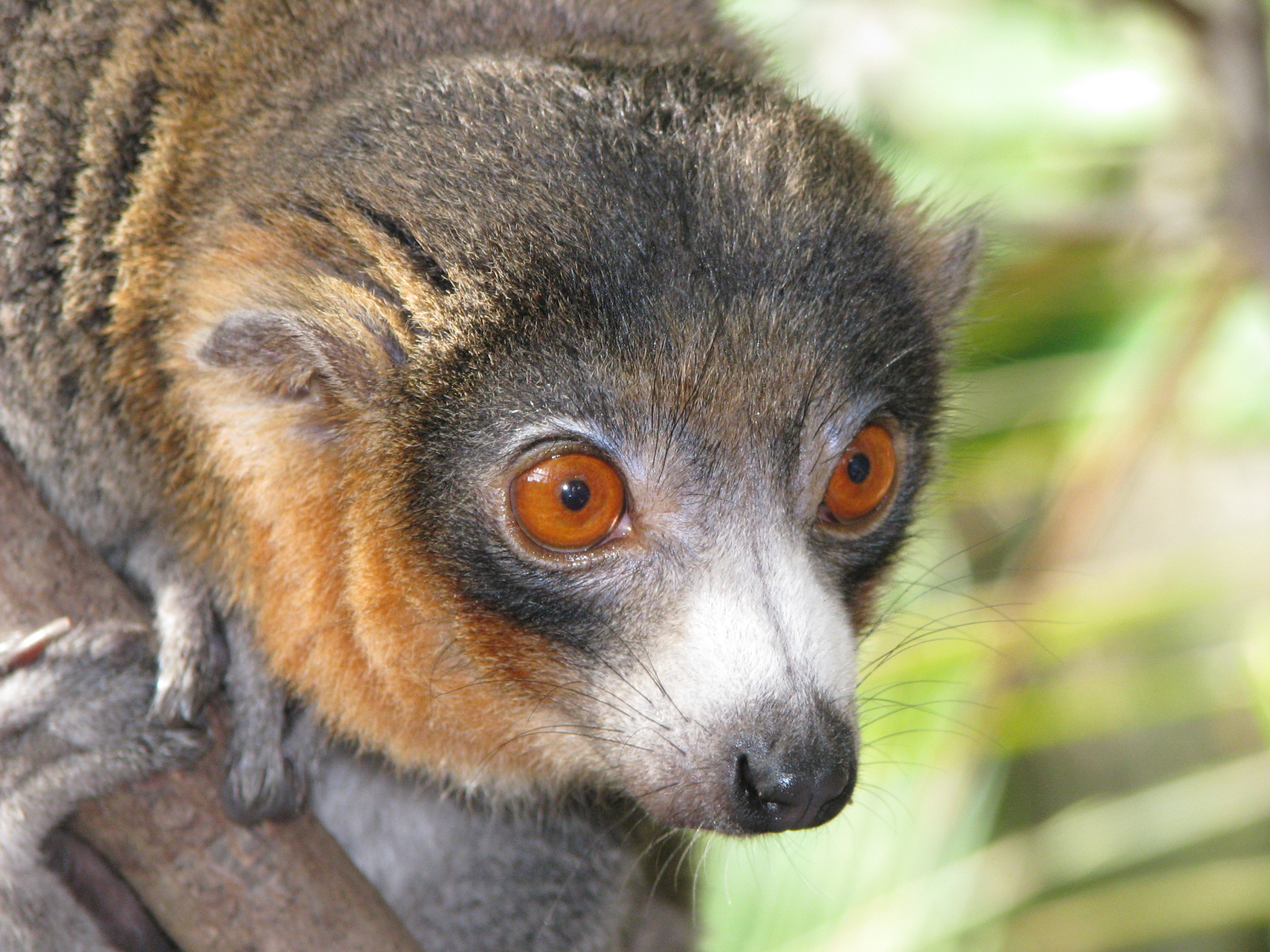
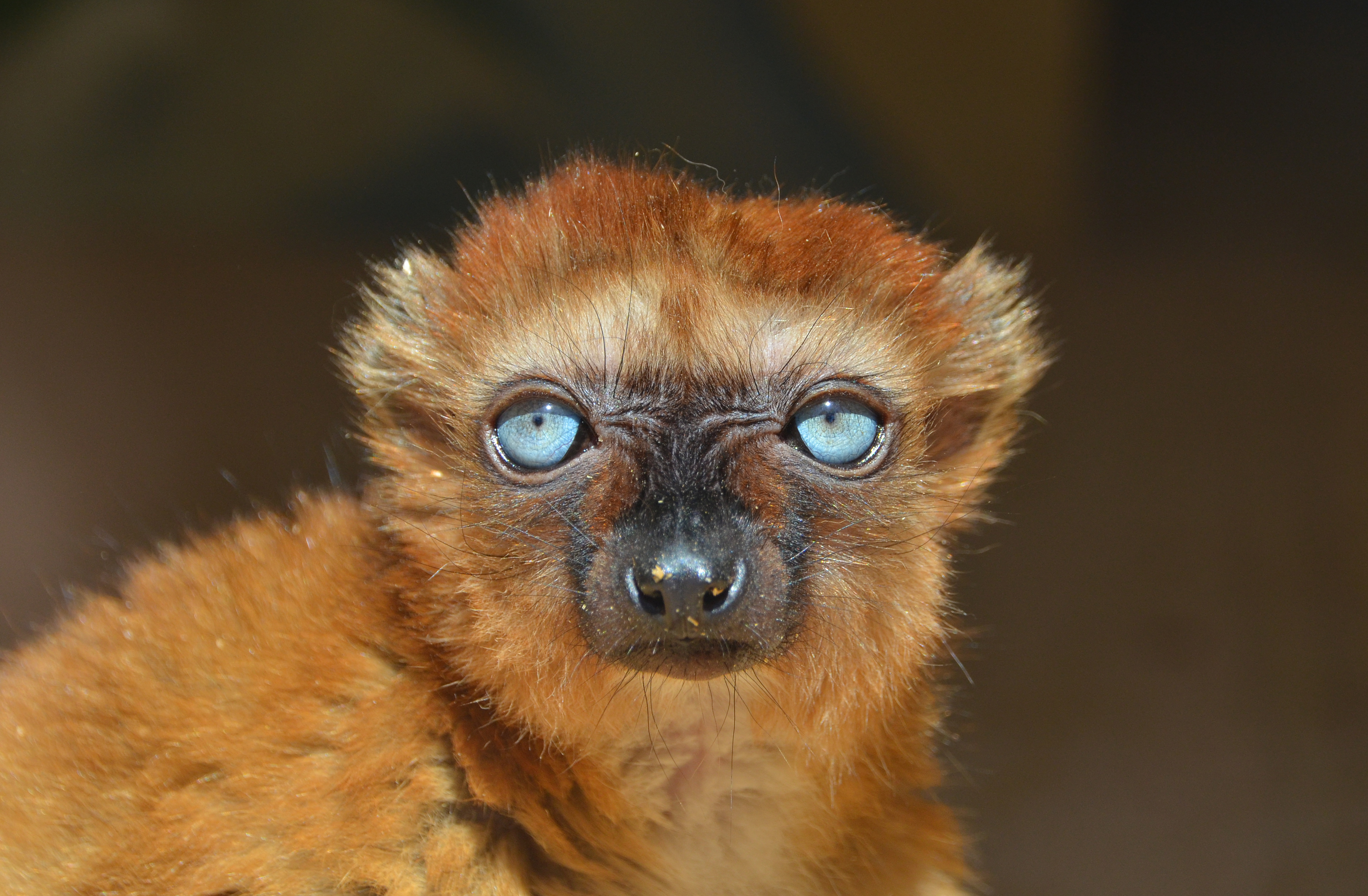
| Humans | Lemurs |
|---|---|
Despite the similarity of appearance, the genetic basis of blue eyes is different in humans and lemurs.

Lemurs and humans are both primates. Ancestral primates had brown eyes, as most primates do today. The genetic basis of blue eyes in humans has been studied in detail and much is known about it. It is not the case that one gene locus is responsible, say with brown dominant to blue eye colour. However, a single locus is responsible for about 80% of the variation. In lemurs, the differences between blue and brown eyes are not completely known, but the same gene locus is not involved.

== In plants ==
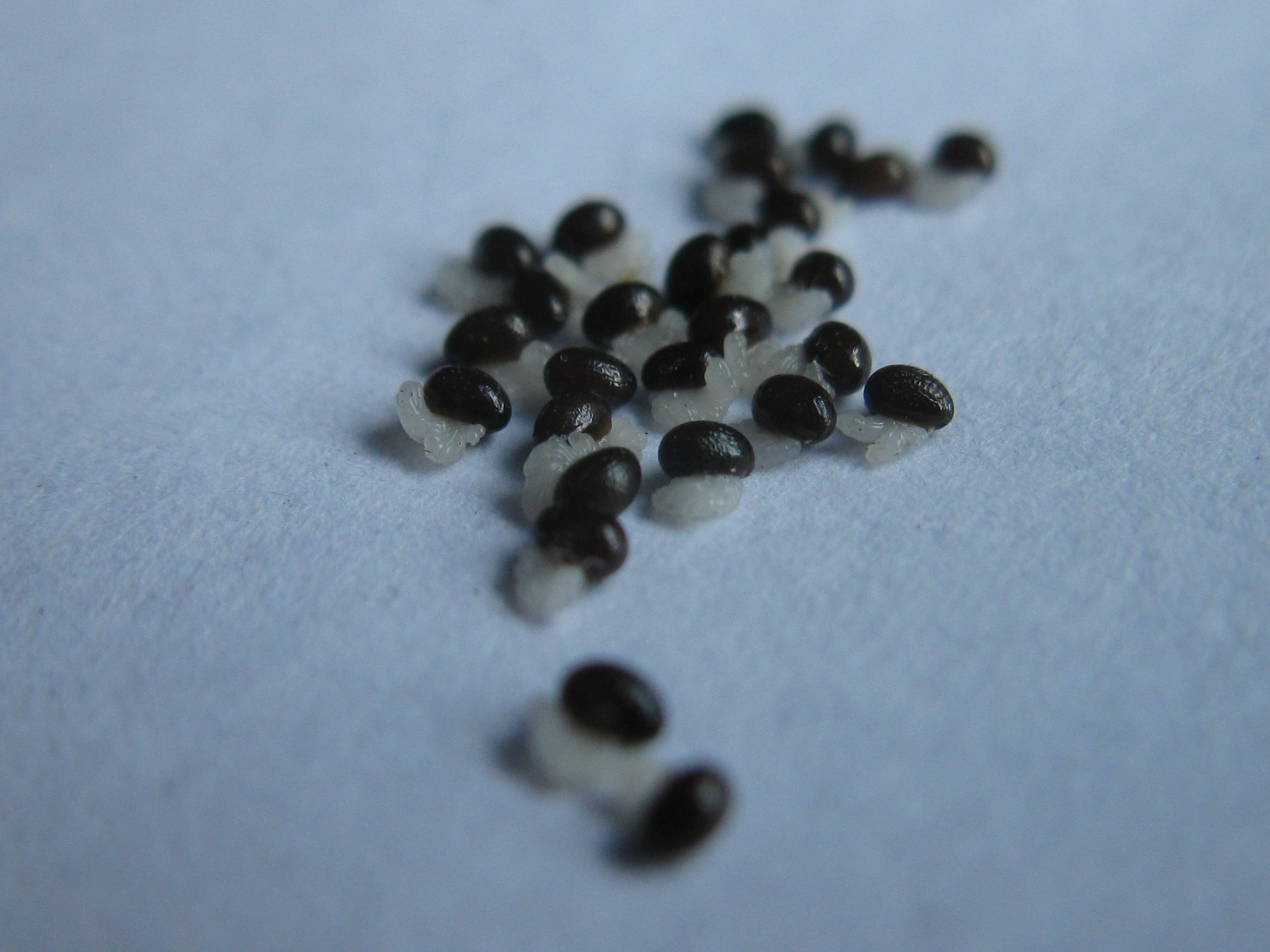
In myrmecochory, seeds such as those of Chelidonium majus have a hard coating and an attached oil body, an elaiosome, for dispersal by ants.

=== The annual life-cycle ===
While most plant species are perennial, about 6% follow an annual life cycle, living for only one growing season. The annual life cycle independently emerged in over 120 plant families of angiosperms. The prevalence of annual species increases under hot-dry summer conditions in the four species-rich families of annuals (Asteraceae, Brassicaceae, Fabaceae, and Poaceae), indicating that the annual life cycle is adaptive.

=== Carbon fixation ===
C_{4} photosynthesis, one of the three major carbon-fixing biochemical processes, has arisen independently up to 40 times. About 7,600 plant species of angiosperms use C_{4} carbon fixation, with many monocots including 46% of grasses such as maize and sugar cane, and dicots including several species in the Chenopodiaceae and the Amaranthaceae.

=== Fruits ===
Fruits with a wide variety of structural origins have converged to become edible. Apples are pomes with five carpels; their accessory tissues form the apple's core, surrounded by structures from outside the botanical fruit, the receptacle or hypanthium. Other edible fruits include other plant tissues; the fleshy part of a tomato is the walls of the pericarp. This implies convergent evolution under selective pressure, in this case the competition for seed dispersal by animals through consumption of fleshy fruits.

Seed dispersal by ants (myrmecochory) has evolved independently more than 100 times, and is present in more than 11,000 plant species. It is one of the most dramatic examples of convergent evolution in biology.

=== Carnivory ===
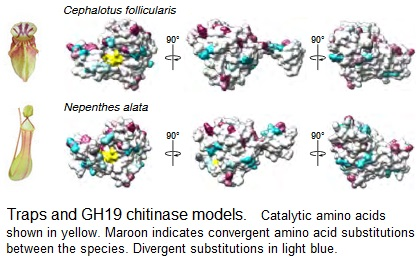
Molecular convergence in carnivorous plants

Carnivory has evolved multiple times independently in plants in widely separated groups. In three species studied, Cephalotus follicularis, Nepenthes alata and Sarracenia purpurea, there has been convergence at the molecular level. Carnivorous plants secrete enzymes into the digestive fluid they produce. By studying phosphatase, glycoside hydrolase, glucanase, RNAse and chitinase enzymes as well as a pathogenesis-related protein and a thaumatin-related protein, the authors found many convergent amino acid substitutions. These changes were not at the enzymes' catalytic sites, but rather on the exposed surfaces of the proteins, where they might interact with other components of the cell or the digestive fluid. The authors also found that homologous genes in the non-carnivorous plant Arabidopsis thaliana tend to have their expression increased when the plant is stressed, leading the authors to suggest that stress-responsive proteins have often been co-opted (Note: The prior existence of suitable structures has been called pre-adaptation or exaptation.) in the repeated evolution of carnivory.

== Methods of inference ==
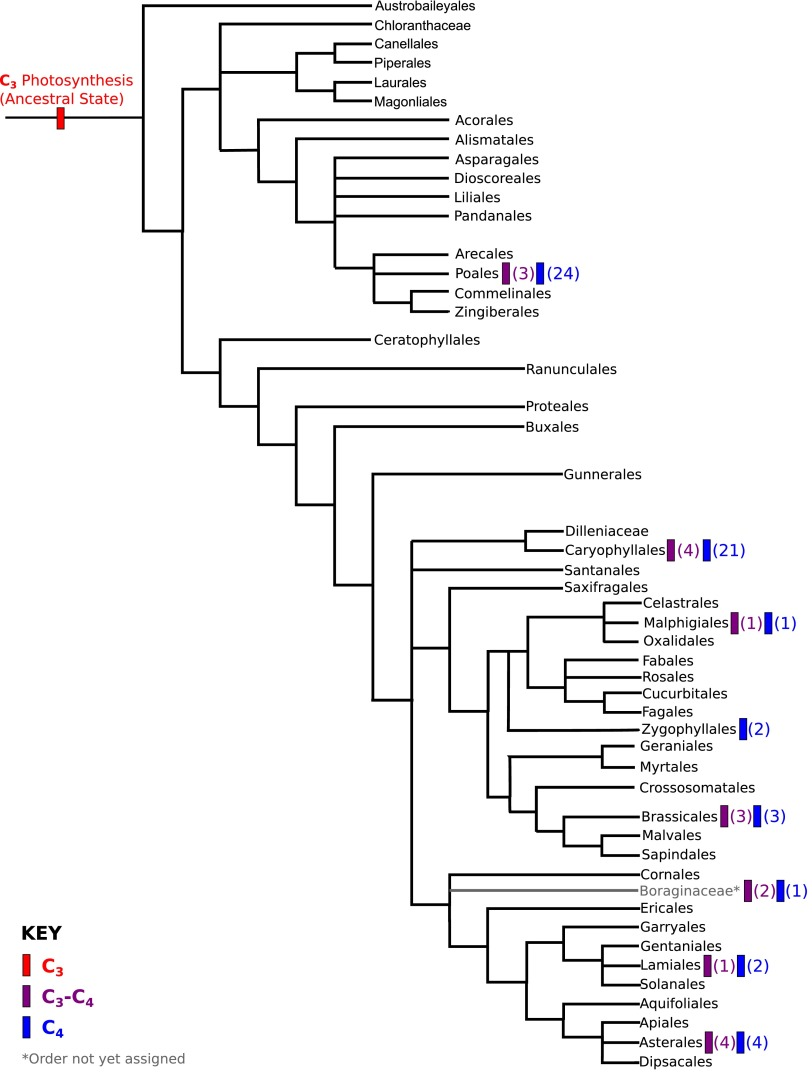
Angiosperm phylogeny of orders based on classification by the Angiosperm Phylogeny Group. The figure shows the number of inferred independent origins of C_{3}-C_{4} photosynthesis and C_{4} photosynthesis in parentheses.

Phylogenetic reconstruction and ancestral state reconstruction proceed by assuming that evolution has occurred without convergence. Convergent patterns may, however, appear at higher levels in a phylogenetic reconstruction, and are sometimes explicitly sought by investigators. The methods applied to infer convergent evolution depend on whether pattern-based or process-based convergence is expected. Pattern-based convergence is the broader term, for when two or more lineages independently evolve patterns of similar traits. Process-based convergence is when the convergence is due to similar forces of natural selection.

=== Pattern-based measures ===
Earlier methods for measuring convergence incorporate ratios of phenotypic and phylogenetic distance by simulating evolution with a Brownian motion model of trait evolution along a phylogeny. More recent methods also quantify the strength of convergence. One drawback to keep in mind is that these methods can confuse long-term stasis with convergence due to phenotypic similarities. Stasis occurs when there is little evolutionary change among taxa.

Distance-based measures assess the degree of similarity between lineages over time. Frequency-based measures assess the number of lineages that have evolved in a particular trait space.

=== Process-based measures ===
Methods to infer process-based convergence fit models of selection to a phylogeny and continuous trait data to determine whether the same selective forces have acted upon lineages. This uses the Ornstein–Uhlenbeck process to test different scenarios of selection. Other methods rely on an a priori specification of where shifts in selection have occurred.

== See also ==
- Breeding back – A form of selective breeding to recreate the traits of an extinct species, but the genome will differ from the original species
- Carcinisation – Evolution of crustaceans into crab-like forms
- Contingency – effect of evolutionary history on outcomes
- Elvis taxon – Misidentification of later taxon superficially resembling earlier extinct taxon
- Incomplete lineage sorting – Characteristic of phylogenetic analysis: the presence of multiple alleles in ancestral populations might lead to the impression that convergent evolution has occurred
- Morphology – Study of external forms and structures of organisms
- Orthogenesis (contrastable with convergent evolution; involves teleology)
- Vavilovian mimicry – Type of biological mimicry in plants
- Polyphyly – Property of a group not united by common ancestry
- Recurrent evolution – Repeated evolution of a particular trait
