= DCH =

DCH may refer to:

- Dah Chong Hong, a Chinese machine-building corporation
- Deccan Chargers, a defunct cricket team in the Indian Premier League (2008–2012)
- Digital Concert Hall, website which streams and transmits the concerts of the Berlin Philharmonic Orchestra on demand
- Dil Chahta Hai, a 2002 Indian Hindi-language film
- Doctor of Clinical Hypnotherapy, a doctorate diploma
