= Functional morphology =

Study of the relationship between form and function in biology

Functional morphology is the study of the relationship between the structure and function of morphological features of organisms. It looks at how this relationship influences phenotypic integration and the interaction between an organism and its environment throughout development, thereby placing it at the intersection of evolutionary biology, anatomy, biomechanics, and ecology.

Unlike traditional descriptive morphology, which focuses primarily on naming and classifying structures, functional morphology seeks to understand how structures work and why they evolved to take their specific shapes.

By examining how organisms interact with their physical environments—such as how a bird's wing generates lift or how a predator's jaw exerts biting force—functional morphologists gain insight into the adaptive significance of traits and the constraints that shape evolutionary history.

== History and development ==
The science of functional morphology can be traced back to Aristotle's observations on the parts of animals and Georges Cuvier's early 19th-century work on comparative anatomy, where he argued that the structure of an organ could predict an animal's lifestyle. In 1830, Cuvier and Etienne Geoffroy Saint-Hilaire engaged in a famous debate, which is said to exemplify the two major deviations in biological thinking at the time—whether animal structure was due to function or to evolution. The debate centered primarily on animal structure; Cuvier asserted that animal structure was determined by an organism's functional needs while Geoffroy suggested an alternative theory that all animal structures were modified forms of a single unified plan.

Modern functional morphology emerged as a distinct discipline in the mid-to-late 20th century. It’s development ran parallel to the integration of engineering principles into biology (biomechanics). More recent developments in biological sciences seek integrate findings from formerly 'balkanised' fields. As part of this process, functional morphology has now taken its place in the range of scientific fields that help scientists develop an integrated approach to understanding life on earth — genetics, epigenetics, paleontology, evolutionary ecology, eco-devo, etc..

== Core concepts ==
=== Form follows function (and vice versa) ===
A central tenet of the functional morphology is that the shape, size, and material properties of a biological structure are tied to its functional role. For example, the specialized mechanics of a woodpecker's skull allow it to absorb high-impact shocks without suffering brain injury.

The reverse could also hold true. Sometimes, a structure evolves for one specific purpose, but its physical shape accidentally makes it suitable for a completely unrelated task. In these cases, the existence of the form triggers a brand-new function — this process has been called exaptation. For example, bird feathers may have initially evolved for temperature regulation, but later were adapted for flight. When feathers were first used to aid in flight, that was an exaptive use.

=== Biomechanical constraints ===
The evolutionary paths of organisms are bound by constraints — physics, chemistry, and phylogenetic history. Functional morphology investigates these constraints:

- Phylogenetic constraints: This refers to the limitations on the future evolutionary pathways that have been imposed by previous adaptations. Organisms can only modify structures that already exist and that they have inherited from their ancestors (e.g., the tetrapod limb structure modified into a bat's wing). Thus, these constraints are the limitations on the future evolutionary pathways that have been imposed by previous adaptations.
- Scaling effects: The "analysis of scaling requires, first, measuring how a biological characteristic changes with size; second, understanding some useful properties of logarithms and statistical regression; and third, application of relevant physical laws." As an organism grows, its volume and weight increase faster than its surface area or muscle cross-sections, forcing changes in shape and posture (allometry). For example, some morphological traits — such as heart size — increase proportionately (isometrically) with body size over a human life, whereas others — such as brain size — increase less than proportionately (hypo-allometrically) with the increase in body size. Scaling effects such as these have been extensively studied in many species, but the exact developmental mechanisms that underpin these scaling effects have yet to be fully understood.

=== Multiple mapping of form to function ===
A single function can often be achieved by multiple different structural designs (e.g., flight in birds, bats, and insects). Conversely, a single structure may serve multiple functions (multifunctional traits), such as a bird's beak being used for feeding, grooming, and thermoregulation.

== Applications ==
Functional morphology provides insights across several areas of science and engineering:

- Paleontology: By understanding how living structures function, scientists can infer the behavior, diet, and locomotion of extinct animals (e.g., predicting the running speed of dinosaurs or the kill tactics of saber tooth tigers).
- Ecomorphology: Examines how the functional design of an organism influences its ecological niche and its competitive interactions within an ecosystem.
- Bio-inspired Design (Biomimicry): Engineers look to functional morphology to design more efficient materials, robotics, and medical devices (e.g., designing velcro based on burr needles or aerodynamic trains based on the kingfisher's beak).

== See also ==
- Comparative anatomy
- Ecomorphology
- Morphometrics
- Comparative physiology
- Atavism
