= Hypnotherapy in the United Kingdom =

In the United Kingdom there are several hypnotherapy organizations. Each one has a code of ethics and practice, seeking to protect the public and maintain professional standards. Over the years, the number of hypnotherapy organizations has proliferated, often associated with particular training schools. There has been a notable lack of co-operation between organizations in establishing any agreed public standard of training and code of practice for the hypnotherapy profession as a whole. However, progress is now being made in this area.

Distinctions can be made between hypnotherapy bodies affiliated to training colleges and those not affiliated – and between commercially operated organizations and professional membership associations or societies that are "not-for-profit" and are owned and operated by the members – and are required to publish accounts – and between those that are owned and operated by individuals (sole traders).

In addition, distinctions can be made between training-level requirements. Some organizations will only train those who already have a medical or psychological qualification – e.g., doctors, psychologists, nurses, dentists – and believe that it is unethical to practice if one has only been trained in hypnosis. Length of training is also important. Some associations accredit members or training courses based on seven days of classroom training, others accredit distance learning, and still others require 120 hours of classroom training, etc. As far as hypnotherapy and any linked activities such as radiesthesia are concerned, it is as of 2017, illegal in countries in Europe but in parts of Asia and Africa is disliked but not prohibited. Various reasons include no real research showing any progress of the natural state of mind when undergoing the process of hypnosis or radiesthesia.

== Voluntary self-regulation ==
Since 2010, the Health Professions Council in the UK has regulated the practice of medicine, psychology, speech therapy, and occupational therapy, etc. They ensure that practitioners are genuine, registered, and meet national standards. There is also a move for psychotherapists and counsellors to be regulated by the HPC in the near future. Hypnotherapy is not covered by HPC regulation.

Hypnotherapy is currently unregulated in the UK. However, following recommendations made by the House of Lords Select Committee on Science and Technology (1999), discussions have taken place into the voluntary self-regulation (VSR) of hypnotherapy. This process was originally overseen by the Prince's Foundation for Integrated Health, which closed down permanently in May 2010. The Prince's Foundation supported the endeavors of the Complementary and Natural Healthcare Council (CNHC) who have been involved in discussion with UKCHO and WGHR over the voluntary self-regulation of hypnotherapy in the UK. It is claimed by WGHR that in a survey they conducted it determined that only 7% of the profession want to see VSR via the CNHC and that the majority of hypnotherapists do not see themselves as "complementary therapists" and want to see discrete regulation for the profession. WGHR has not published the survey. UKCHO has conducted no such survey, but is a democratic body that represents the views and policies of its constituent organizations.

Major concerns have been raised over hypnotherapy entering the CNHC. Notable among them is that hypnotherapy is a talking therapy such as counseling rather than a complementary therapy like reflexology. The CHNC also has been widely criticized for registering therapies and therapists without reference to the evidence base for their practice. In addition, the CNHC complaints procedure would allow for hypnotherapists to be complained about by other hypnotherapists, irrespective of whether the complaint relates to actual therapy with a client, and this complaint could then be made public. Finally, many hypnotherapists question the validity of "VSR" arguing that if it is voluntary it offers no public protection.

== Grades of practitioner ==
Various grades are used across organizations to indicate the level of training, qualifications, and experience of hypnotherapy practitioners. Because different standards are used by different registers, it is difficult to compare practitioners. Usually, terms such as Licensed, Registered, and Accredited signify that the practitioner meets the requirements of the register. Terms such as Associate or Affiliate may be used in various ways. The Hypnotherapy Society uses "Associate" to distinguish members who are not considered ready to practice and Licentiate, Member, and Accredited Member for those who are. Only professional members are listed on the website. For example, the National Council for Hypnotherapy (NCH) uses "Associate Membership" for anyone with an interest in hypnotherapy, but you are not listed as a practitioner or are able to use the NCH name, logo, or any membership grade letters. NCH Full members are clearly defined as either 'Registered' or 'Accredited' and every NCH qualified member has access to an NCH seal that updates daily.[1] By comparison, the GHR Affiliate Grade (available at Foundation Course level of 50 hours) does confer the use of the GHR logo, membership grade letters, and, critically, a listing in the Registered Hypnotherapist directory pages of the GHR.

Note: Probably the essential point for the public is whether an organization lists a therapist in their public directory of registered, practicing hypnotherapists or not – rather than whether the grade is Licentiate, Affiliate, Accredited etc.

National Occupational Standards

In 2002, the Department for Education and Skills developed National Occupational Standards for Hypnotherapy linked to a National Vocational Qualification based on the National Qualifications Framework under the Qualifications and Curriculum Authority. And thus hypnotherapy was approved as a stand-alone therapy in the UK. There are now many training schools that claim that their qualifications are "nationally recognized" or "conform to national occupational standards" but there is no way of independently verifying this. In 2010, NOS was revised via Skills for Health and the HRF. Present at the meetings for NOS revisions was Liz McGelligot, who is also a Membership Officer for the Hypnotherapy Society, albeit acting in her capacity as a member of the Forum. The new revised standards are much smaller [further explanation needed] than the previous set.

== Membership numbers – claims, verifiability etc. ==
Claims to be "the largest" professional hypnotherapy body can lead to perceived market leadership, increased status with hypnotherapists and even influence the future direction of hypnotherapy regulation. For example, the GHR claims to be the largest hypnotherapy organisation with 3,000+ registered hypnotherapists – however does that mean paying members or merely practitioners on its database? Indeed, claimed numbers have changed considerably over the years for this organization.

=== GHR practitioner numbers over the years ===
Year	2006	2007	2008	2010
Claimed GHR practitioner Numbers (source: GHR website homepage)	3,500	7,000	8,000	3,000+

There appears to be no way to verify these numbers or indeed those of any of the organizations (with the exception possibly of NCH who have published their accounts in the NCH Journal and so paid memberships can be calculated, and the Hypnotherapy Society whose accounts are logged at Companies House).

For example, the Hypnotherapy Society claims to have over 2,000 members. Accounts l at Companies House confirm an income of £104,889 in 2010 up from £98,548 in 2009. This is independently verifiable via Companies House. (no reference provided). With existing membership fees at £80 per annum this indicates a membership of 1,311 members. However, a large percentage of HS members only pay £20 per year because of the long-standing nature of their membership (student member grades) or cooperation agreements with other organizations. The Hypnotherapy Society's claims to approximately 2,000 members, given its publicly verifiable turnover, are thus reasonable. All HS members listed on the website are full professional practitioner grade members. The Society requires all accredited training schools with over 20 students per year to register those students as members on graduation.

=== Who represents and speaks for the hypnotherapy profession ===
As claims to large membership numbers give representatives of professional bodies seats around the table in claiming to represent the industry when talking to, for example, the Department of Health – and therefore directing the future of hypnotherapy regulation these claims must be verifiable. Being a stakeholder in this field does not rely on membership number claims alone but on a balanced overall view of the organization taken by relevant government departments and NGOs.

== Transparency ==
It is notable that some major hypnotherapy organizations have little transparency – especially about board members, trustees, controlling interests, Annual General Meetings, election of officers and use of funds.

For example, the Hypnotherapy Society claims income over £104,000 per annum. Yet there are no published accounts to show what the income is used for.

The General Hypnotherapy Register has unpublished income – however if one is to believe the claim of 3,000 members then income is above £220,000 per year. The costs of the GHR are likely to be minimal with a simple website, a monochrome 4-page quarterly newsletter and a home office run by the owner, William Broom. (However, this is a commercial for-profit entity and is not comparable to the actual member's associations.)

In comparison, it may be seen that some historic hypnotherapy membership associations, such as the National Council for Hypnotherapy (NCH), more commonly publish their accounts and other structural information annually.

To achieve greater transparency membership associations could publish accounts and other relevant organizational information on their websites.

== See also ==
- Hypnosis
- Hypnosurgery
- Psychotherapy

== Bibliography ==
- Savage, G.H, The Harveian Oration on Experimental Psychology and Hypnotism Delivered before the Royal College of Physicians of London, October 18, 1909, Henry Frowde, (London), 1909.
