= Recurrent evolution =

Repeated evolution of a particular trait

Recurrent evolution also called repeated or replicated evolution is the repeated evolution of a particular trait, character, or mutation. Most evolution is the result of drift, often interpreted as the random chance of some alleles being passed down to the next generation and others not. Recurrent evolution is said to occur when patterns emerge from this stochastic process when looking across multiple distinct populations. These patterns are of particular interest to evolutionary biologists, as they can demonstrate the underlying forces governing evolution.

Recurrent evolution is a broad term, but it is usually used to describe recurring regimes of selection within or across lineages. While most commonly used to describe recurring patterns of selection, it can also be used to describe recurring patterns of mutation; for example, transitions are more common than transversions. The concept encompasses both convergent evolution and parallel evolution; it can be used to describe the observation of similar repeating changes through directional selection as well as the observation of highly conserved phenotypes or genotypes across lineages through continuous purifying selection over large periods of evolutionary time.

== Phenotypic vs. genotypic levels ==
Recurrent changes may be observed at the phenotype level or the genotype level. At the phenotype level, recurrent evolution can be observed across a continuum of levels, which for simplicity can be broken down into molecular phenotype, cellular phenotype, and organismal phenotype. At the genotype level, recurrent evolution can only be detected using DNA sequencing data. The same or similar sequences appearing in the genomes of different lineages indicates recurrent genomic evolution may have taken place. Recurrent genomic evolution can also occur within a lineage; an example of this would include some types of phase variation that involve highly directed changes at the DNA sequence level. The evolution of different forms of phase variation in separate lineages represents convergent and recurrent evolution toward increased evolvability. In organisms with long generation times, any potential recurrent genomic evolution within a lineage would be difficult to detect. Recurrent evolution has been studied most extensively at the organismal level, but with the advent of cheaper and faster sequencing technologies more attention is being paid to recurrent evolution at the genomic level.

== Convergent, parallel, and recurrent evolution ==
The distinction between convergent and parallel evolution is somewhat unresolved in evolutionary biology. Some authors have claimed it is a false dichotomy, while others have argued that there are important distinctions. These debates are important when considering recurrent evolution because the basis for the distinction is in the degree of phylogenetic relatedness among the organisms being considered. While convergent and parallel evolution can both be interpreted as forms of recurrent evolution, they involve multiple lineages whereas recurrent evolution can also take place within a single lineage.

As mentioned before, recurrent evolution within a lineage can be difficult to detect in organisms with long generation times; however, paleontological evidence can be used to show recurrent phenotypic evolution within a lineage. The distinction between recurrent evolution across lineages and recurrent evolution within a lineage can be blurred because lineages do not have a set size and convergent or parallel evolution takes place among lineages that are all part of or within the same greater lineage. When speaking of recurrent evolution within a lineage, the simplest example is that given above, of the "on-off switch" used by bacteria in phase variation, but it can also involve phenotypic swings back and forth over longer periods of evolutionary history. These may be caused by environmental swings – for example, natural fluctuations in the climate, or a pathogenic bacterium moving between hosts – and represent the other major source of recurrent evolution.

== Examples ==
=== At the phenotypic level ===
On the island of Bermuda, the shell size of the land snail Poecilozonites has increased during glacial periods and shrunk again during warmer periods. It has been proposed that this is due to the increased size of the island during glacial periods (as a consequence of lower sea levels), which results in more large vertebrate predators and creates a selection pressure for larger shell size in the snails.

In eusocial insects, new colonies are usually formed by a solitary queen, though this is not always the case. Dependent colony formation, when new colonies are formed by more than one individual, has evolved recurrently multiple times in ants, bees, and wasps.

Recurrent evolution of polymorphisms in colonial invertebrate bryozoans of the order Cheilostomatida has given rise to zooid polymorphs and certain skeletal structures several times in evolutionary history.

Neotropical tanagers of the genera Diglossa and Diglossopis, known as flowerpiercers, have undergone recurrent evolution of divergent bill types.

There is evidence for at least 133 transitions between dioecy and hermaphroditism in the sexual systems of bryophytes. Additionally, the transition rate from hermaphroditism to dioecy was approximately twice the rate in the reverse direction, suggesting greater diversification among hermaphrodites and demonstrating the recurrent evolution of dioecy in mosses.

C4 photosynthesis has evolved over 60 times in different plant lineages. This has occurred through the repurposing of genes present in a C3 photosynthetic common ancestor, altering levels and patterns of gene expression, and adaptive changes in the protein-coding region. Recurrent lateral gene transfer has also played a role in optimizing the C4 pathway by providing better adapted C4 genes to the plants.

=== At the genotypic level ===
Certain genetic mutations occur with measurable and consistent frequency. Deleterious and neutral alleles can increase in frequency if the mutation rate to this phenotype is sufficiently higher than the reverse mutation rate; however, this appears to be rare. Beyond creating new genetic variation for selection to act upon, mutations plays a primary role in evolution when mutations in one direction are "weeded out by natural selection" and mutations in the other direction are neutral. This is known as purifying selection when it acts to maintain functionally important characters but also results in the loss or diminished size of useless organs as the functional constraint is lifted. An example of this is the diminished size of the Y chromosome in mammals, which can be attributed to recurrent mutations and recurrent evolution.

The existence of mutational "hotspots" within the genome often gives rise to recurrent evolution. Hotspots can arise at certain nucleotide sequences because of interactions between the DNA and DNA repair, replication, and modification enzymes. These sequences can act like fingerprints to help researchers locate mutational hotspots.

Cis-regulatory elements are frequent targets of evolution resulting in varied morphology. When looking at long-term evolution, mutations in cis-regulatory regions appear to be even more common. In other words, more interspecific morphological differences are caused by mutations in cis-regulatory regions than intraspecific differences.

Across Drosophila species, highly conserved blocks not only in the histone fold domain but also in the N-terminal tail of centromeric histone H3 (CenH3) demonstrate recurrent evolution by purifying selection. In fact very similar oligopeptides in the N-terminal tails of CenH3 have also been observed in humans and in mice.

Many divergent eukaryotic lineages have recurrently evolved highly AT-rich genomes. GC-rich genomes are rarer among eukaryotes, but when they evolve independently in two different species the recurrent evolution of similar preferential codon usages will usually result.

"Generally, regulatory genes occupying nodal position in gene regulatory networks, and which function as morphogenetic switches, can be anticipated to be prime targets for evolutionary changes and therefore repeated evolution."

== See also ==
- Convergent evolution
- Parallel evolution
