= Atavistic regression =

Reversion to a more primitive mental state under hypnosis

Atavistic regression is a hypnosis-related concept introduced by the Australian scholar and psychiatrist Ainslie Meares. Meares coined his term from the English atavism, which is derived from the Latin atavus, meaning a great-grandfather's grandfather and, thus, more generally, an ancestor.

As used by Meares, for example, his 1960 work A System of Medical Hypnosis, the term "atavistic regression" is used to denote the tendency to revert to ancestral type:

"The atavistic hypothesis requires… a regression from normal adult mental function at an intellectual, logical level, to an archaic level of mental function in which the process of suggestion determines the acceptance of ideas. This regression is considered to be the basic mechanism in the production of hypnosis."

Meares held the view that when in hypnosis, the higher (more evolved) functions of the subject's brain were switched off, and the subject reverted to a far more archaic and far less advanced (in evolutionary terms) mental state; something which significantly altered the subjects' cognitive processing so that they readily accepted internally consistent, literal logic without any of the normal filters and verifications against the objective facts of the real world.

Later, Meares came to believe that it was the atavistic regression rather than the treatments that went with hypnosis that helped the patient. He concluded that the regression enabled the mind to rest and restored its equilibrium in a way that was analogous to sleep. On one hand people who did not spontaneously undergo this process became tense and unable to let their guard down. On the other hand, helping people to learn how to experience this state a couple of times a day seemed to facilitate mental coping which Meares believed was due to sufficient mental rest.

By this time he had completed a transition from hypnosis in which he took a large role to the smaller role of facilitator showing patients how to induce this state themselves. He referred to this regressed state by different names at different times e.g.: relaxing meditative experience, relaxing mental exercise, deep relaxation, atavistic regression, mental ataraxis. Contemporary teachers of his method may refer to this as Stillness Meditation or Stillness Meditation Therapy, although some use other terms. Some other traditions use the term stillness meditation and these unrelated systems have little in common with Meares' method.

== Atavistic Regression in Smoking Cessation Therapy ==
Atavistic regression, a concept related to hypnosis, is proposed to have potential implications for smoking cessation therapy. This concept posits that by regressing to a more primitive, suggestible mental state, an individual may become more receptive to therapeutic suggestions. In hypnotherapy, this regressed state might be used to facilitate access to the subconscious mind, potentially aiding in smoking cessation efforts. The application of atavistic regression in hypnotherapy for smoking cessation is discussed, referencing the experiences detailed by André Kramer on his website, which focuses on hypnosis for quitting smoking.

While hypnotherapy that induces atavistic regression for smoking cessation is an area of interest, its effectiveness and mechanisms require further empirical validation. Hypnotherapy can potentially assist individuals in addressing subconscious motivations and altering behavioral patterns. It may also offer increased focus and suggestibility, potentially aiding individuals in achieving their goal to quit smoking, and could help in managing stress, a known trigger for smoking. However, comprehensive empirical studies are necessary to substantiate these claims. It should be emphasized that hypnotherapy, when considered for smoking cessation, is recommended as part of a broader program encompassing behavioral therapy, support groups, and other interventions. The importance of seeking hypnotherapy services from certified and experienced professionals is crucial to ensure both safety and efficacy of the treatment.
