= Hypnotherapy =

Type of complementary and alternative medicine

Hypnotherapy, also known as hypnotic medicine, is the use of hypnosis in psychotherapy. Hypnosis is a state of deep focus and openness to suggestion that usually begins with relaxation and guided instructions. Some people respond more strongly than others, and researchers explain that hypnosis is not a magical trance but a form of concentrated attention and expectation (Heap & Naish, 2012). Hypnotherapy is generally not considered to be based on scientific evidence, and is rarely recommended in clinical practice guidelines.

== Definition ==
The United States Department of Labor's Dictionary of Occupational Titles (DOT) describes the job of the hypnotherapist:

"Induces hypnotic state in client to increase motivation or alter behavior patterns: Consults with client to determine nature of problem. Prepares client to enter hypnotic state by explaining how hypnosis works and what client will experience. Tests subject to determine degree of physical and emotional suggestibility. Induces hypnotic state in client, using individualized methods and techniques of hypnosis based on interpretation of test results and analysis of client's problem. May train client in self-hypnosis conditioning."

=== Traditional ===
The form of hypnotherapy practiced by most Victorian hypnotists, including James Braid and Hippolyte Bernheim, mainly employed direct suggestion of symptom removal, with some use of therapeutic relaxation and occasionally aversion to alcohol, drugs, etc.

=== Ericksonian ===
In the 1950s, Milton H. Erickson developed a radically different approach to hypnotism, which has subsequently become known as "Ericksonian hypnotherapy" or "Neo-Ericksonian hypnotherapy." Based on his belief that dysfunctional behaviors were defined by social tension, Erickson coopted the subject's behavior to establish rapport, a strategy he termed "utilization." Once rapport was established, he made use of an informal conversational approach to direct awareness. His methods included complex language patterns and client-specific therapeutic strategies (reflecting the nature of utilization). He claimed to have developed ways to suggest behavior changes during apparently ordinary conversations.

This divergence from tradition led some, including Andre Weitzenhoffer, to dispute whether Erickson was right to label his approach "hypnosis" at all. Erickson's foundational paper, however, considers hypnosis as a mental state in which specific types of "work" may be done, rather than a technique of induction.

The founders of neuro-linguistic programming (NLP), a method somewhat similar in some regards to some versions of hypnotherapy, claimed that they had modelled the work of Erickson extensively and assimilated it into their approach. Weitzenhoffer disputed whether NLP bears any genuine resemblance to Erickson's work.

=== Solution-focused ===
In the 2000s, hypnotherapists began to combine aspects of solution-focused brief therapy (SFBT) with Ericksonian hypnotherapy to produce therapy that was goal-focused (what the client wanted to achieve) rather than the more traditional problem-focused approach (spending time discussing the issues that brought the client to seek help). A solution-focused hypnotherapy session may include techniques from NLP.

=== Cognitive/behavioral ===
Cognitive behavioral hypnotherapy (CBH) is an integrated psychological therapy employing clinical hypnosis and cognitive behavioral therapy (CBT). The use of CBT in conjunction with hypnotherapy may result in greater treatment effectiveness. A meta-analysis of eight different types of research revealed "a 70% greater improvement" for patients undergoing an integrated treatment than those using CBT only.

In 1974, Theodore X. Barber and his colleagues published a review of the research which argued, following the earlier social psychology of Theodore R. Sarbin, that hypnotism was better understood not as a "special state" but as the result of normal psychological variables, such as active imagination, expectation, appropriate attitudes, and motivation. Barber introduced the term "cognitive-behavioral" to describe the nonstate theory of hypnotism, and discussed its application to behavior therapy.

The growing application of cognitive and behavioral psychological theories and concepts to the explanation of hypnosis paved the way for closer integration of hypnotherapy with various cognitive and behavioral therapies.

Many cognitive and behavioral therapies were themselves originally influenced by older hypnotherapy techniques, e.g., the systematic desensitisation of Joseph Wolpe, the cardinal technique of early behavior therapy, was originally called "hypnotic desensitisation" and derived from the Medical Hypnosis (1948) of Lewis Wolberg.

=== Curative ===
Peter Marshall, author of A Handbook of Hypnotherapy, devised the Trance Theory of Mental Illness, which asserts that people suffering from depression, or certain other kinds of neuroses, are already living in a trance. He states that this means the hypnotherapist does not need to induce trance, but instead to make them understand this and lead them out of it.

=== Mindful ===
Mindful hypnotherapy is a therapy that incorporates mindfulness and hypnotherapy. A pilot study was made at Baylor University, Texas, and published in the International Journal of Clinical and Experimental Hypnosis. Gary Elkins, director of the Mind-Body Medicine Research Laboratory at Baylor University, called it "a valuable option for treating anxiety and stress reduction" and "an innovative mind-body therapy". The study showed a decrease in stress and an increase in mindfulness.

=== Relationship to scientific medicine ===
Hypnotherapy practitioners occasionally attract the attention of mainstream medicine. Attempts to instill academic rigor have been frustrated by the complexity of client suggestibility, which has social and cultural aspects, including the practitioner's reputation. Results achieved in one time and center of study have not been reliably transmitted to future generations.

In the 1700s, Anton Mesmer offered pseudoscientific justification for his practices, but a commission that included Benjamin Franklin debunked his rationalizations.

== Effectiveness ==
According to the Royal College of Psychiatrists, "studies have shown that hypnotherapy can help to treat a range of physical and mental health conditions" and "In many cases, hypnotherapy and other uses of suggestion can provide fast, effective treatment".

=== Menopause ===
Hypnosis may be useful for treating some symptoms of menopause, such as hot flashes and night sweats. In 2023, the North American Menopause Society recommended using hypnosis for the nonhormonal management of menopause-associated vasomotor symptoms. A 2024 review indicated that hypnosis has potential benefit for treating some symptoms of menopause.

=== Irritable bowel syndrome ===
The use of hypnotherapy in treating the symptoms of irritable bowel syndrome is supported by research, including randomized controlled trials. Gut-directed hypnotherapy is recommended in the treatment of irritable bowel syndrome by the American College of Gastroenterology clinical guideline for the management of IBS.

=== Childbirth ===
Hypnotherapy is often applied in the birthing process and the post-natal period, but there is insufficient evidence to determine if it alleviates pain during childbirth and no evidence that it is effective against post-natal depression.

=== Bulimia nervosa ===
Literature shows that a wide variety of hypnotic interventions have been investigated for the treatment of bulimia nervosa, with inconclusive effects. Similar studies have shown that groups suffering from bulimia nervosa, undergoing hypnotherapy, were more exceptional to no treatment, placebos, or other alternative treatments.

=== Anxiety ===
Hypnotherapy is shown to be comparable in effectiveness to other forms of therapy, such as cognitive behavioral therapy, that utilize relaxation techniques and imagery. It has also shown to be successful when used to reduce anxiety in those with dental anxiety and phobias.

=== PTSD ===
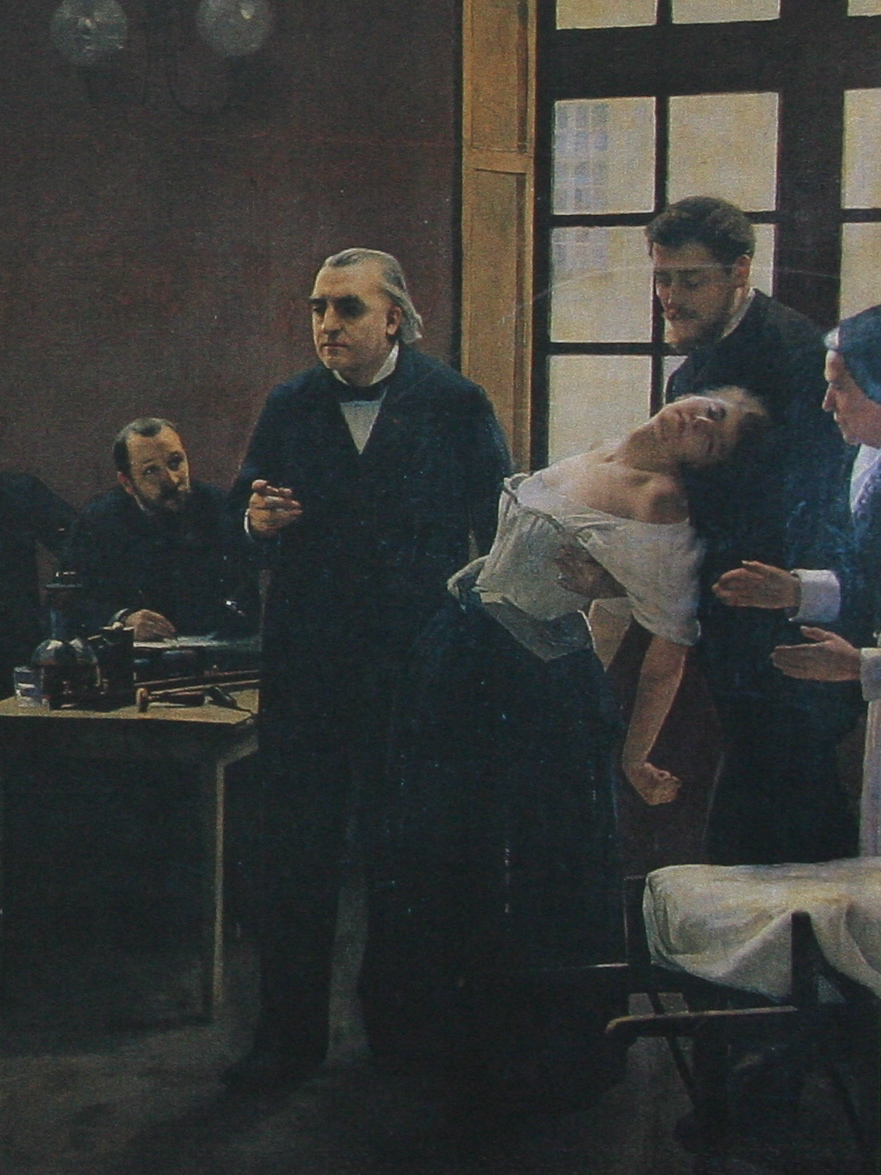
Professor Charcot, his students, and a woman experiencing hysteria.

Post-traumatic stress disorder (PTSD) and its symptoms have been shown to improve due to the implementation of hypnotherapy, in both the long and short term. As research continues, hypnotherapy is being more openly considered as an effective intervention for those with PTSD.

=== Depression ===
Hypnotherapy is effective when used to treat long-term depressive symptoms. It is comparable to the efficacy of cognitive behavioral therapy, and when used in tandem, efficacy seems to increase.

=== Other uses ===
Historically hypnotism was used therapeutically by some psychiatrists in the Victorian era, to treat the condition then known as hysteria.

Modern hypnotherapy has been used to treat certain habit disorders and control irrational fears, and addiction.

- A 2003 meta-analysis on the efficacy of hypnotherapy concluded that "the efficacy of hypnosis is not verified for a considerable part of the spectrum of psychotherapeutic practice."
- In 2007, a meta-analysis from the Cochrane Collaboration found that the therapeutic effect of hypnotherapy was "superior to that of a waiting list control or usual medical management, for abdominal pain and composite primary IBS symptoms, in the short term in patients who fail standard medical therapy", with no harmful side effects. However, the authors noted that the quality of data available was inadequate to draw firm conclusions.
- Two Cochrane reviews in 2012 concluded that there was insufficient evidence to support its efficacy in managing the pain of childbirth or post-natal depression.
- A 2014 meta-analysis that focused on hypnotherapy's efficacy on irritable bowel syndrome found that it was beneficial for short-term abdominal pain and other gastrointestinal issues.
- In 2016, a literature review published in La Presse Médicale found that there is not sufficient evidence to "support the efficacy of hypnosis in chronic anxiety disorders".
- In 2016, an article was published on the efficacy of Hypnotherapy as an aide to stroke rehabilitation.
- In 2019, a Cochrane review was unable to find evidence of a benefit of hypnosis in smoking cessation and suggested that if there is, it is small at best.
- A 2019 meta-analysis of hypnosis as a treatment for anxiety found that "the average participant receiving hypnosis reduced anxiety more than about 79% of control participants," also noting that "hypnosis was more effective in reducing anxiety when combined with other psychological interventions than when used as a stand-alone treatment."
- A 2024 parallel randomized control trial of cognitive behavioral therapy and hypnotherapy that took hypnotic suggestibility into consideration for sustained smoking cessation showed that the two therapies were roughly equivalent in their efficacy.

== The anthropological approach to hypnotherapy ==
Scheper-Hughes and Margaret Lock created the Three Bodies approach as a medical anthropological framework that aims to expand and challenge the Western biomedical understanding of the mind, body and medicine.

=== The individual body ===
Hypnotherapy involves understanding the relationship between an individual’s bodily experiences, emotions, thoughts and subjective experience. Bonshtein describes “two-person hypnosis” as an interpersonal process where both the therapist and client can influence the hypnotic experience. However, the individual remains an important part of this process because everyone experiences hypnosis differently. A person’s thoughts, emotions, memories, beliefs and previous experiences can affect how they respond to suggestions. This means the individual is not simply a passive receiver of hypnosis, but actively interprets sensations and responds to what they experience. This can also be seen in experiences of sleep paralysis. Ramos describes a case involving a 62-year-old man who experienced recurrent sleep paralysis and waking nightmares. Relational hypnotherapy, combined with suggestions linked to lucid dreaming, helped him develop different ways of responding to these experiences. His own interpretations and experiences were important to the therapy because it focused on helping him understand his bodily sensations and frightening experiences differently. This shows how an individual’s thoughts, emotions, bodily sensations and personal meanings can shape their experience of hypnotherapy. Overall, the individual is an active part of hypnotherapy, with their personal experiences and understanding working together with the therapeutic relationship.

=== The Body politic ===
Hypnotherapy has been recognised throughout history across cultures as an alternative therapy and, at different points, within the biomedical field. However, its legitimacy has been contested. It has never only been about whether this form of healing “works”, but also about who gets to decide what counts as legitimate medicine and how hypnotherapy is understood. Each culture has its own shared epistemologies that shape what constitutes knowledge and “truth”. However, these understandings are also influenced by who holds authority within the body politic and who has the power to define what is legitimate or illegitimate within medicine. Western biomedicine tends to privilege particular forms of evidence, prioritising scientific measurement over forms of knowledge that may be more difficult to test or measure. This creates a dominant standard for what is considered credible medical knowledge. Long’s article, Therapeutic aqompaniments: Walking Together in Hypnotherapy and Ethnography, draws on 16 months of ethnographic fieldwork with Indonesian hypnotherapists. Long explores how hypnotherapy can be understood as an “anthropological object” and shows how its meaning and practice are shaped by cultural and institutional contexts. In Indonesia, hypnotherapy was unregulated until 2014, when government regulation introduced permits for practitioners. This demonstrates how political and institutional structures can shape the legitimacy and practice of healthcare. Biomedical hegemony therefore influences which forms of knowledge are treated as credible, shaping whether hypnotherapy is understood as legitimate treatment or as an alternative or pseudoscientific practice.

=== The social body ===
Some anthropological approaches to healing practices have examined how bodily experiences are shaped by broader cultural and social meanings. Nancy Scheper-Hughes and Magaret Lock’s concept of the social body considers the body as a symbol and that the understanding of bodies, health, sickness and healing are shaped by how a society understands relationships, order, morals, nature and the supernatural. Claude Lévi-Strauss’s The Sorcerer and His Magic examines how healing can obtain its meaning and efficacy from a shared system of belief between the healer, the person seeking healing and the wider community. These perspectives can be considered alongside Maurício S. Neubern’s When Spirits Become Therapists: Ethnopsychology and Hypnotherapy in Brazil, which is a case study of women undergoing long-term hypnotherapy in which the woman describes spiritual beings communicating through her during the hypnotherapy and trance. Neubern emphasizes Brazil as a society where different systems of knowledge such as both spiritual and biomedical understandings are able to coexist. He argues that hypnotherapy risks misunderstanding spiritual experiences if they get reduced to categories of imagination or hallucination. In his case study, the therapist instead tried to understand the spiritual manifestations through the patient’s own references and incorporated them into the hypnotherapy process. Neubern describes this as a meeting of worlds, where individual and collective knowledge become part of the therapeutic process. He therefore proposes that hypnotherapy’s principles of acceptance and utilization should be broadened to also include the cultural worlds, knowledge and practices through which patients understand their experiences.

== Occupational accreditation ==
=== United States ===
The laws regarding hypnosis and hypnotherapy vary by state and municipality. Some states, like Colorado, Connecticut, and Washington, have mandatory licensing and registration requirements, while many other states have no specific regulations governing the practice of hypnotherapy.

=== United Kingdom ===
==== UK National Occupational Standards ====
In 2002, the Department for Education and Skills developed National Occupational Standards for hypnotherapy linked to National Vocational Qualifications based on the then National Qualifications Framework under the Qualifications and Curriculum Authority. NCFE, a national awarding body, issues a level four national vocational qualification diploma in hypnotherapy. Currently, AIM Awards offers a Level 3 Certificate in Hypnotherapy and Counselling Skills at level 3 of the Regulated Qualifications Framework.

==== UK Confederation of Hypnotherapy Organisations (UKCHO) ====
The regulation of the hypnotherapy profession in the UK is at present the main focus of UKCHO, a non-profit umbrella body for hypnotherapy organisations. Founded in 1998 to provide a non-political arena to discuss and implement changes to the profession of hypnotherapy, UKCHO currently represents 9 of the UK's professional hypnotherapy organisations and has developed standards of training for hypnotherapists, along with codes of conduct and practice that all UKCHO-registered hypnotherapists are governed by. As a step towards the regulation of the profession, UKCHO's website now includes a National Public Register of Hypnotherapists who have been registered by UKCHO's Member Organisations and are therefore subject to UKCHO's professional standards. Further steps to regulate the hypnotherapy profession will be taken in consultation with the Prince's Foundation for Integrated Health.

==== The National Council for Hypnotherapy (NCH) ====
The National Council for Hypnotherapy is a Professional Association, established in 1973 to create a National Membership Organisation for independent Hypnotherapy Practitioners. The organisation is not for profit with a Board of 12-15 people composed of Executives and Directors, the latter usually 'in practice' Hypnotherapists and trainers of Hypnotherapy. The current Chair, Tracey Grist, has been in the position since 2016.

The NCH is a VO (Verifying organisation) for the CNHC, which means that NCH members meet the criteria to become CNHC registrants.

The NCH membership meets the national hypnotherapy training standards via the externally verified Hypnotherapy Practitioner Diploma (HPD) through the NCFE.

Members agree to follow the CECP; the NCH's ethical code of practice. All members are expected to be insured to practice, meet supervision requirements, and meet annual CPD expectations.

=== Australia ===
The Australian government does not regulate professional hypnotherapy and the use of the occupational titles hypnotherapist or clinical hypnotherapist.

In 1996, as a result of a three-year research project led by Lindsay B. Yeates, the Australian Hypnotherapists Association (founded in 1949), the oldest hypnotism-oriented professional organization in Australia, instituted a peer-group accreditation system for full-time Australian professional hypnotherapists, the first of its kind in the world, which "accredit[ed] specific individuals on the basis of their actual demonstrated knowledge and clinical performance; instead of approving particular 'courses' or approving particular 'teaching institutions'" (Yeates, 1996, p.iv; 1999, p.xiv). The system was further revised in 1999.

Australian hypnotism/hypnotherapy organizations (including the Australian Hypnotherapists Association) are seeking government regulation similar to other mental health professions. However, currently, hypnotherapy is not subject to government regulation through the Australian Health Practitioner Regulation Agency (AHPRA).

== See also ==
- Abreaction – Psychoanalytical term
- Astral projection – Interpretation of out-of-body experiences
- Atavistic regression – Reversion to a more primitive mental state under hypnosis
- Autogenic training – Relaxation technique
- Automatic writing – Claimed psychic ability
- Autosuggestion – Psychological technique related to the placebo effect
- Confabulation – Recall of fabricated, misinterpreted or distorted memories
- Doctor of Clinical Hypnotherapy – Unaccredited degree in hypnotherapy in the United States
- False memory – Psychological occurrence
- Hypnotherapy in the United Kingdom
- Hypnosis – State of increased suggestibility
- Hypnosurgery – Practice of using hypnosis for sedation during surgery
- Hypnotic Ego-Strengthening Procedure – Hypnotherapeutic procedure
- Ideomotor phenomenon – Concept in hypnosis and psychological research
- Mind–body interventions – Health and fitness interventions
- Nancy School of Hypnosis – French school of psychotherapy from 1866
- Polygraph – Device purported to detect lies
- Psychoneuroimmunology – Area of study within psychosomatic medicine
- Psychosomatic medicine – Interdisciplinary medical field exploring various influences on bodily processes
- Psychotherapy – Clinically applied psychology for desired behavior change
- Recovered-memory therapy – Scientifically discredited form of psychotherapy
- Regression (psychology) – Mental defence mechanism in psychoanalysis
- Repressed memory – Theory that memory may be stored in the unconscious mind
- Royal Commission on Animal Magnetism – 1784 French scientific bodies' investigations involving systematic controlled trials
- Salpêtrière School of Hypnosis – French school of psychotherapy from 1882
- Scientific skepticism – Questioning of claims lacking empirical evidence
- Source-monitoring error – Type of memory error
- Subconscious mind – Part of the mind that is not currently of focal awareness
- Suggestibility – Inclination to accept the suggestions of others
- The Pregnant Man and Other Cases from a Hypnotherapist's Couch (book) – 2010 book by Deirdre Barrett
- The Zoist: A Journal of Cerebral Physiology & Mesmerism, and Their Applications to Human Welfare – Academic journal devoted to pseudoscientific concepts
- Unconscious mind – Mental processes not available to introspection
