= Cuvier–Geoffroy debate =

1830 scientific debate

Cuvier-Geoffrey debate
- Part of history of evolutionary thought
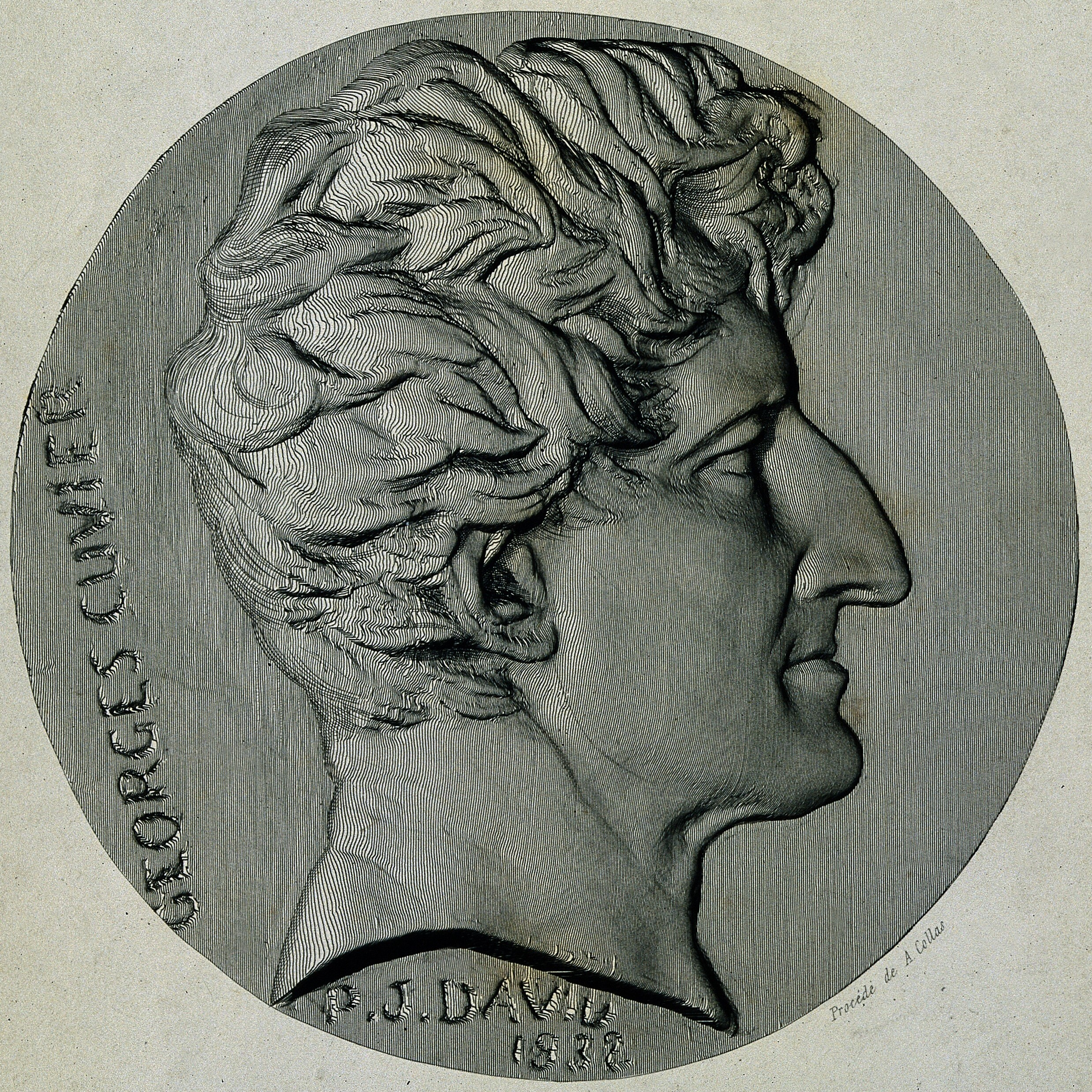
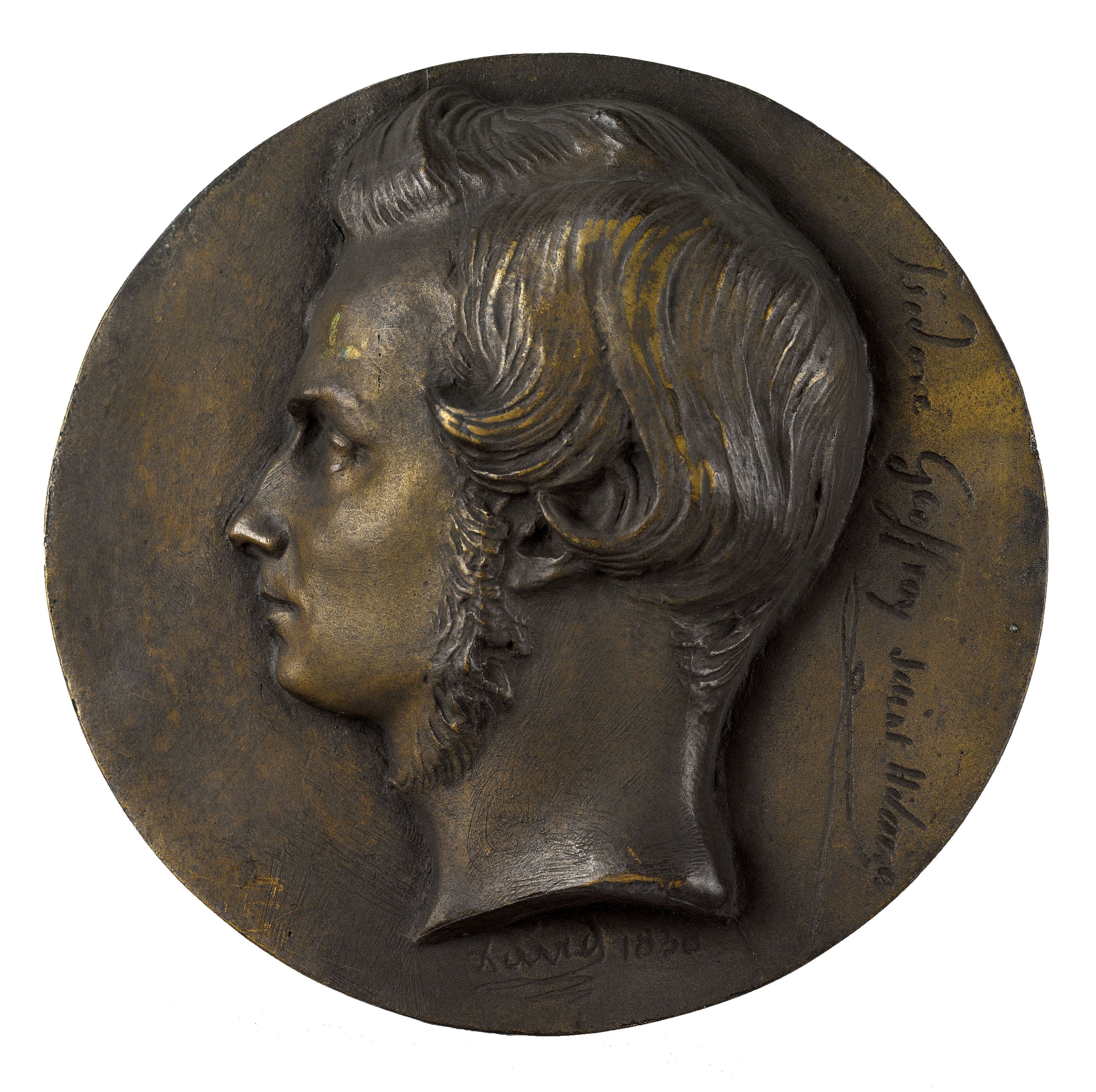
- Medallions of Cuvier (left) and Geoffroy (right)
- Date: February 15, 1830 – April 5, 1830
- Resulted in: Geoffroy quits responding; Cuvier considered winner

Parties
Georges Cuvier	Étienne Geoffroy Saint-Hilaire

The Cuvier–Geoffroy debate of 1830 was a scientific debate between the two French naturalists Georges Cuvier and Étienne Geoffroy Saint-Hilaire. For around two months the debate occurred in front of the French Academy of Sciences. The debate centered primarily on animal structure; Cuvier asserted that animal structure was determined by an organism's functional needs while Geoffroy suggested an alternative theory that all animal structures were modified forms of one unified plan. In terms of scientific significance, the discussion between the two naturalists showed stark differences in scientific methods as well as general philosophy. Cuvier is generally considered the winner of the debate, as he always came better prepared to the debate with overwhelming amounts of evidence and more logical arguments, as well as having more political and academic influence. Despite this, Geoffroy's philosophy is seen as early support of evolution theory and parts of the theory of the "unity of composition" are generally more accepted over Cuvier's fixed species philosophy.

== Early lives ==
Both naturalists had a love for classification and description but grew up with different influences. Geoffroy came to Paris to study medicine, law and philosophy in early 1789, but shifted to the study of zoology not long after. When a priest mentor of Geoffroy's became caught up in the political turmoil of the revolution of 1789, it was through Geoffroy's testimony that the priest was released from prison. Making friends in the church led to his eventual appointment as a zoology professor in the Royal Garden (later became the Museum of Natural History), when a post was vacated due to more political problems. Although he was only twenty-one years old at the time, this position gave Geoffroy access to resources and natural collections in which he built his future theories on nature. He was even able to accompany Napoleon on an expedition to Egypt in 1798 where he studied mummies and made hypotheses on change over time in humans and other organisms. Geoffroy agreed with Buffon that any classification system was arbitrary and thus somewhat empty, but he nonetheless attempted to find the general laws that applied to all organisms in nature.

Before their well-known rivalry developed, the two scientists began as close colleagues and friends. Cuvier met a member of the Academy of Sciences, Henri-Alexandre Tessier, in Normandy in 1794 while he was a young man tutoring the children of the wealthy. Tessier was impressed by Cuvier's talent and skill, and soon after wrote glowing letters to established scientists like Geoffroy and another, Jussier. Geoffroy was charmed by Cuvier's detailed descriptions of animals and his precise sketches and decided to invite him to "come to Paris. Come play among us the role of another legislator of natural history." When Cuvier joined him at the Museum, other colleagues warned Geoffroy against mentoring him, suggesting that this brilliant young scientist would eventually surpass him. Despite this premonition, both scientists worked side by side and wrote five papers together on the classification of mammals, the two-horned African rhinoceros, species of elephants, descriptions of the tarsier, and the biology of the orangutan. It was not long before Cuvier began to make a name for himself individually too, as he was highly skilled at reaching out to patrons, networking and acquiring funding for his research. By 1796 Cuvier was working on his papers on extinction, merely two years after joining the Museum, while Geoffroy had barely begun to publish. One of the most significant events that solidified the split between the two scientists was Cuvier's appointment to the Academy of Sciences on December 17, 1795 as one of the six original members of anatomy and zoology. Cuvier was only twenty-six years old (three years Geoffroy's junior) and the youngest member at the time, while Geoffroy was not given admittance to the Academy for another twelve years.

== Differing viewpoints ==
Prior to the debate, biological scientists were generally split into two major factions: whether animal structure was determined by functional needs of an animal or the "conditions of existence" (Cuvier), or a basic unified form that was modified across all animal forms (Geoffroy). By determining the answer to this question, scientists could also shed light on the mechanisms of the evolution of species, as well as potentially finding a useful system to classify species to better understand the order of nature. Cuvier was an influential scientist with significant political power and many prominent positions: permanent secretary at the French Academie of Science, a professorship at the Museum of Natural History and the College of France, as well as a Council member at the University of France. Cuvier stuck to "positive facts" of science and refused to flirt with hypotheses and unsupported ideas. This attitude sprang from worries that this kind of thinking would lead to unrest and disorder in France as the French Revolution had torn through only a few decades before. Cuvier encouraged young scientists to stick with facts and often won them over easily due to his strong reputation as a good ally to have in science. His political ties and academic connections gave his ideas a broader audience and generally more historical recognition. Geoffroy was heavily influenced by Buffon and Lamarck. It was in his memoir Philosophie anatomique, published in 1818, that he first put his ideas on animal form and structure into print. Here he attempted to answer his own question, "Can the organization of vertebrated animals be referred to as one uniform type?" Cuvier on the other hand was known as Lamarck's greatest critic, as Cuvier felt Lamarck was too speculative without enough facts to back up his theories. Cuvier grew up reading the works of Linnaeus and was mostly self-taught through dissection and measurements of organisms. Geoffroy thought of facts as building blocks to science while new ideas would lead to real discovery, occasionally dipping more into philosophical hypotheses instead of testable or demonstrated research. Geoffroy kept his unpopular ideas under wraps when advantageous to his career but found it increasingly difficult to stay passive as he got older and more well known.

== The debate (1830) ==
While the two biologists had disagreed on animal structure subtly through their publications, talks with other scientists at Academy meetings, and in private, a paper on mollusks written by two relatively unknown scientists drew Geoffroy and Cuvier at arms. The paper, written by Meyranx and Laurencet, was assigned to Geoffroy and Pierre André Latreille to review and report to the Academy. Meyranx and Laurencet's conclusions grabbed Geoffroy's attention by suggesting a link between vertebrate and mollusk internal anatomy. With thousands of drawings of mollusks and multiple essays, the authors argued that the organ arrangement of a mollusk resembled vertebrate organ arrangement, if the vertebrate bent backwards so that the neck was connected to the backside. Geoffroy found support for his unity of composition which would unite the vertebrates and mollusks -two of Cuvier's published embranchments of animals- on one common plan.

=== Geoffroy's initial report ===
On February 15, 1830, Geoffroy presented his report to the Academy. In an epilogue that was eventually removed from the final report at Cuvier's insistence, Geoffroy made a clear attack at Cuvier by quoting from a work of Cuvier's from 1817, "Memoir on the Cephalopods and on Their Anatomy", though the author and actual manuscript name were not mentioned. Geoffroy ridiculed the old-fashioned way of describing nature by focusing on differences instead of similarities, presenting his unity of composition theory as a better alternative. Cuvier disagreed vehemently with the report and paper's findings, promising to further explain his argument in future writings.

=== Cuvier's first response ===
At the next meeting of the Academy on February 22, Cuvier came fully prepared with detailed, labeled, colorful drawings, in particular one of an octopus and another of a duck bent backwards, and a new memoir called "Considerations on the Mollusks and in Particular on the Cephalopods". He attacked Geoffroy's argument carefully and strategically. First, he argued for clear definitions in science and no ambiguity in language. Cuvier then proposed that composition was defined as the arrangement of parts. By this definition, to imagine that all organisms consisted of the same organs arranged in the same manner was illogical and false. Cuvier called Geoffroy's unity of composition more of a vague analogy for the composition of animals than true science. He emphasized how analogies did not belong in real science. Next Cuvier gave his own report on Meyranx and Laurencet's paper, showing example after example of how vertebrate and mollusk organ arrangement differed, whether by physical location or orientation in the body. By overwhelming the audience with his plethora of knowledge on cephalopod anatomy, he undercut Geoffroy's credibility and made a convincing argument of his own. After this point the debate became less about the mollusk data and more an argument between two differing scientific philosophies.

=== Further discussion ===
On March 1, 1830, Geoffroy returned with his rebuttal, "On the Theory of Analogues, to Establish Its Novelty as a Doctrine, and Its Practical Utility as an Instrument". In response to Cuvier's comments about unity of composition being poorly defined, Geoffroy claimed that he was seeking more "philosophical resemblances" other than actual, observable similarities between animals. This vague explanation of unity of composition and the claim that others did not understand what unity of composition really meant did not satisfy Cuvier or his other critics. Geoffroy went on to defend his analogical theory, stressing the methodology of it all to align it to the scientific method. His theory looked at the connections between animals, and therefore was still applicable to making discoveries in science. To illustrate his points, Geoffroy used the example of the hyoid bone in vertebrates. He compared multiple animals with differing numbers of pieces making up the hyoid bone. In the cat with 9 hyoid pieces and humans with 5, Geoffroy made hypotheses for where the extra pieces had gone in humans, suggesting shifts to the ligaments and other bones of the jaw. Cuvier in response compared the hyoid bones across multiple species, where he saw different numbers of parts, different arrangements of the parts and in some, no hyoid at all. To Cuvier these differences suggested different functional needs and did not support unity of composition as Geoffroy said. To counter Cuvier's very analytical approach, Geoffroy said his rival was simply getting too bogged down in the details and forgetting the main issue of differences in philosophy. Cuvier continued to supply examples of differences amongst animal form, insisting Geoffroy explain why nature would be constrained to using the same parts similarly across all species.

=== End of the debate ===
By April 1830, the Academy was getting bored with the debate. At this point it had become far too personal and less about the ideas discussed but rather a continuous opportunity to bash each other publicly and academically. Geoffroy finally declined to provide further comment on April 5, 1830. His reasons for ending the debate are not entirely known, but it's generally believed Cuvier won the debate with his commanding presence and overwhelming amounts of evidence.

== Results of the debate ==
After Geoffroy's initial inflammatory report, some other scientists in the Academy felt pressed to choose a side. In an effort to protect his reputation, the co-author on the report, Latreille, wrote to Cuvier to deny his participation in the report presented to the Academy, as well as to disassociate himself from Geoffroy's unity of composition theory. Cuvier had just the year before helped Latreille, a rather old man of sixty-seven, replace Lamarck as a professor in the Museum. Both authors of the original cephalopod paper wrote to Cuvier as well to apologize for the trouble their paper had caused. However, the damage to Meyranx and Laurencet's careers may already have been done, as no future works by the authors have been recorded, nor is their cephalopod paper to be found.

After the debate officially ended, both naturalists continued to throw in snide mentions to each other's works in Academy discussion, though neither Geoffroy nor Cuvier openly engaged each other again. The press and scientific journals followed their volatile disagreements up until Cuvier's death by cholera a mere two years after the debate. While the two naturalists were unable to reconcile their ideas in life, Geoffroy spoke at Cuvier's funeral quite fondly of his former friend, feeling pleased "to have been the first to recognize and reveal to the learned world the scope of genius who did not yet know it himself", as well as saying anyone who studied the science of nature/natural history owed it to Cuvier for laying the foundation with his genius and massive knowledge of the natural world. While neither Geoffroy or Cuvier's ideas were fully adopted in future science theory, both unity of composition and functional morphology can be seen as influences to further works on the natural world. Geoffroy's ideas of unity of composition and development of more complex organisms from a common, less complex plan often recognize Geoffroy as one of the first to accept evolution theory.

== See also ==
- Adaptationism
- Structuralism (biology)
