= Doctor of Clinical Hypnotherapy =

Unaccredited degree in hypnotherapy in the United States

The Doctor of Clinical Hypnotherapy (DCH) degree is an unaccredited degree in hypnotherapy in the United States. When such a degree is available, it is often granted by schools offering distance education, usually in conjunction with existing hypnotherapy certification programs. Because the majority of hypnotherapy degrees are offered through programs that are unaccredited in nature, they do not have to meet any requirements established by national licensing standards.

== Consumer concerns ==
Accredited doctorate degrees in mental health, such as M.D., Ph.D., Psy.D., and Ed.D., are tightly controlled by state and federal laws. The D.C.H. degree is largely unregulated. There is a growing concern among these professionals that hypnotists are misleading consumers. Some have illegally attempted to offer psychotherapy under generic titles such as "doctor" or "psychotherapist", without proper training or background.

== Hypnotherapy training ==
There are several professional membership organizations in the United States that require minimum standards in specialized hypnotherapy education to become members as well as certified as a hypnotherapist (C.Ht.). Most of these organizations certify vocational hypnotherapists, and do not require health care training or experience for certification.

== American Institute of Hypnotherapy (AIH) ==
Originally approved by the State of California to grant degrees in early 1980s, the American Institute of Hypnotherapy offered unaccredited bachelors and doctorate degrees in clinical hypnotherapy. The program could be completed by distance learning and directed independent study (DIS) but required reading and essays as well as attendance at seminars, practicals and workshops. The degree became known as a DCH after state regulators prohibited the AIH from referring to their degree as a PhD.

== See also ==
- Hypnotherapy in the United Kingdom
- Hypnosis
