= Hypnosurgery =

Practice of using hypnosis for sedation during surgery

Hypnosurgery is surgery where the patient is sedated using hypnotherapy rather than traditional anaesthetics. It is claimed that hypnosis for anaesthesia has been used since the 1840s where it was pioneered by the surgeon James Braid. There are occasional media reports of surgery being conducted under hypnosis, but since these are not carried out under controlled conditions, nothing can be concluded from them. In 2013 in the University of Padova, Italy, Hypnosis was used as sole anaesthesia for a skin tumour removal in a patient with multiple chemical sensitivity who couldn't use chemical drugs.

There is insufficient evidence to support the efficacy of hypnosis in managing pain in other contexts, such as childbirth or post-operative pain.

== History ==
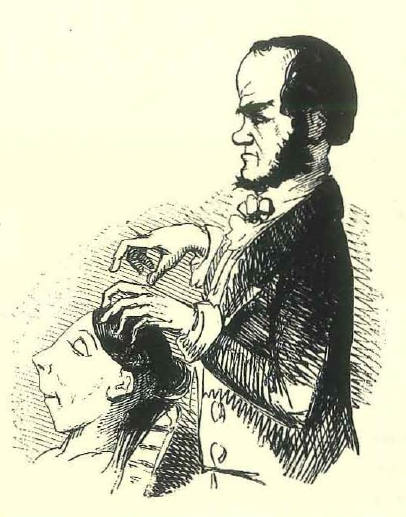
John Elliotson 1843 Punch Cartoon Mesmerism

Mesmerism, also called animal magnetism, is the term given by Franz Mesmer for what he believed to be an invisible natural force in animals. He also believed that it could have physical effects such as healing.

James Braid who is credited for pioneering hypnosurgery, first observed mesmerism while he was attending a public performance on magnetism by Charles Lafontaine. After attending two more shows he came to the conclusion that although there were observable physical effects, it was not caused by any magnetic interference. Braid then used self-experiment to prove his idea that mesmerism was achieved by vision and concentration of the subject. The citation here does not appear to support the sentence whatsoever, please consider this.

It is claimed that hypnosis has been used in surgery for pain management, to control spasms in the alimentary canal, during rehabilitation, and as anaesthesia during an operation.

The first alleged case of hypnosis as an anesthetic in surgery was when Jules Germain Cloquet (1790–1883), a French surgeon, operated on a woman's breast while she was purportedly under the influence of hypnosis. The operation was for the removal of a tumor. Over the course of his career, he claimed to have performed several successful surgeries using hypnosis as the only form of anesthesia.

While stationed at the River Valley Road prisoner of war hospital in Singapore in 1945, with the supplies of chemical anesthetics severely restricted by the Japanese, Michael Woodruff and a medical/dental colleague from the Royal Netherlands Forces used hypnotism as the sole means of anesthesia for a wide range of dental and surgical procedures.

== Preparing the patient for hypnosurgery ==
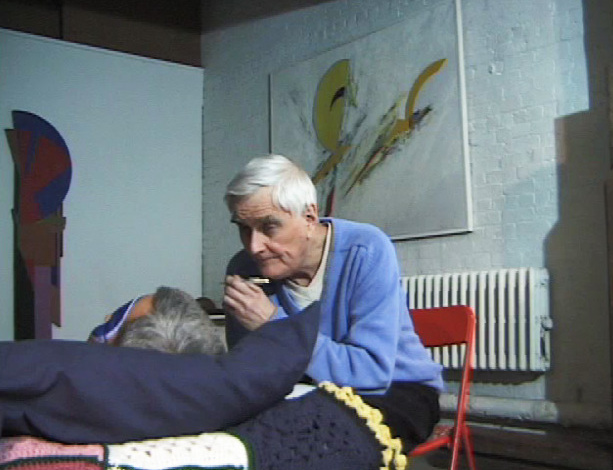
Hypnotherapy session

At the present time, preparing a patient for hypnosurgery would include having several 50–60 minutes' sessions of hypnotherapy done by a hypnotherapist. Each individual session focuses on controlling the pain and relaxing the mind. The number of hypnotherapy sessions varies according to the patient and their susceptibility to hypnosis. Generally, the patient would be ready for hypnosurgery after 6 weeks of training.

== Post-operative hypnosis ==
Hypnosis may also be helpful post-surgery in helping to facilitate faster healing in patients, with one study reporting faster tissue healing in patients who use hypnosis during surgical recovery. Several other studies have shown a psychological link with healing and recovery. In a study of patients up to seven weeks after undergoing a surgical procedure, researchers found greater healing and improvement in patients who had used hypnosis over those who only received supportive attention or standard "standard postoperative care".

A recent Cochrane review on the efficacy of various psychological therapies (including hypnosis) on post-surgical outcomes concluded that "the strength of evidence is insufficient to reach firm conclusions on the role of psychological preparation for surgery" and the quality of the evidence was reportedly "very low."

== See also ==
- Surgery
- Cardiac surgery
- Trauma surgery
