= Atavism =

Reappearance of a genetic trait once thought extinct

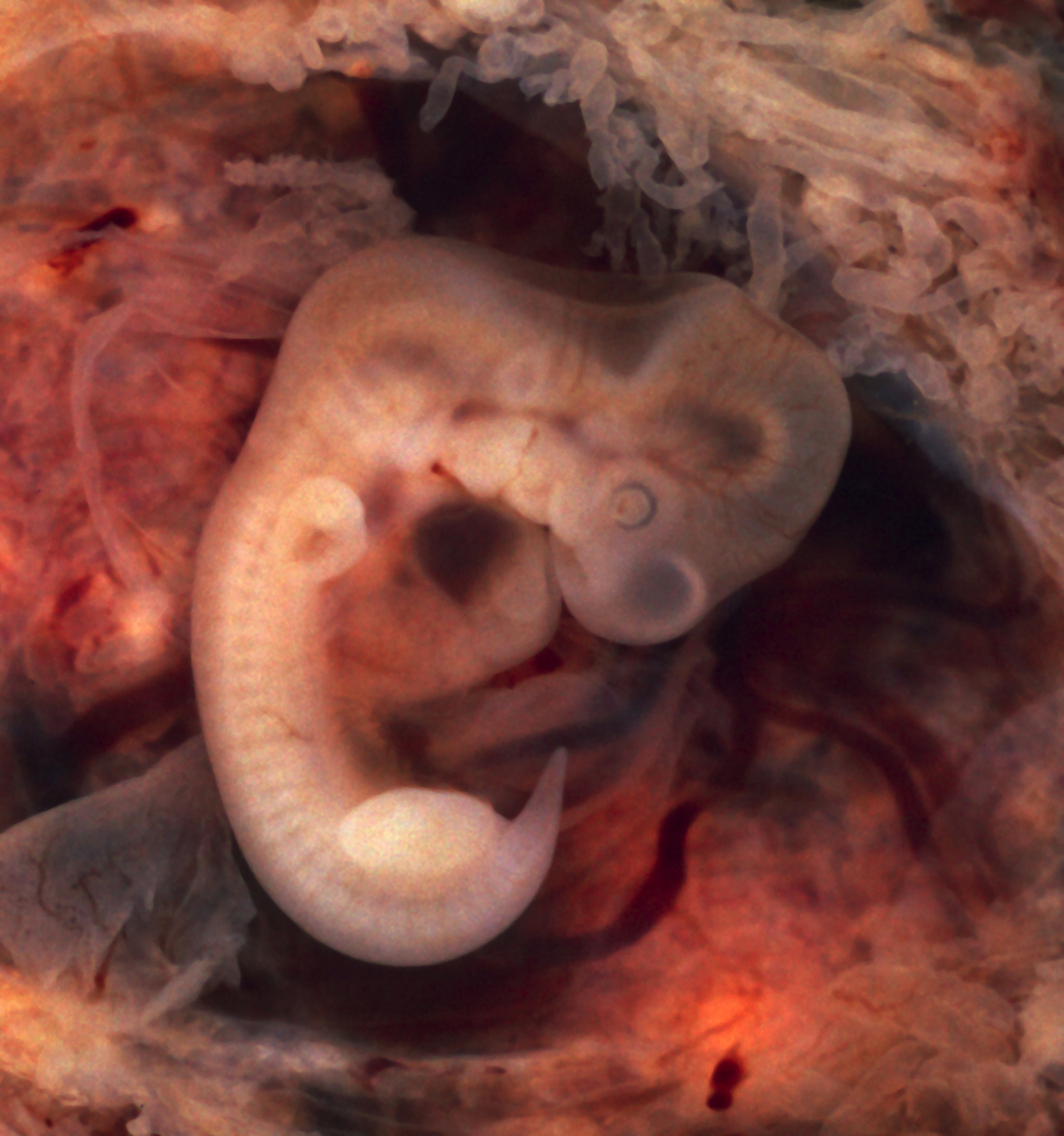
Early embryos of various species display some ancestral features, like the tail on this human embryo. These features normally disappear in later development, but it may not happen if the animal has an atavism.

In biology, an atavism (/ˈætəˌvɪzəm/ AT-ə-viz-əm) is a modification of a biological trait's structure or behavior whereby an ancestral genetic trait reappears after having been lost through evolutionary change in previous generations. Atavisms can occur in several ways, one of which is when genes for previously existing phenotypic features are preserved in DNA, and these become expressed through a mutation that either knocks out the dominant genes for the new traits or makes the old traits dominate the new one. A number of traits can vary as a result of shortening of the fetal development of a trait (neoteny) or by prolongation of the same. In such a case, a shift in the time a trait is allowed to develop before it is fixed can bring forth an ancestral phenotype. Atavisms are often seen as evidence of evolution.

In social sciences, atavism is the tendency of reversion: for example, people in the modern era reverting to the ways of thinking and acting of a former time.

The word atavism is derived from the Latin word atavus—a great-great-great-grandfather or, more generally, an ancestor.

== Biology ==
Evolutionarily traits that have disappeared phenotypically do not necessarily disappear from an organism's DNA. The gene sequence often remains, but is inactive. Such an unused gene may remain in the genome for many generations. As long as the gene remains intact, a fault in the genetic control suppressing the gene can lead to it being expressed again. Sometimes, the expression of dormant genes can be induced by artificial stimulation.

Atavisms have been observed in humans, such as with infants born with vestigial tails (called a "coccygeal process", "coccygeal projection", or "caudal appendage"). Atavism can also be seen in humans who possess large teeth, like those of other primates. In addition, a case of "snake heart", the presence of "coronary circulation and myocardial architecture [that closely] resemble those of the reptilian heart", has also been reported in medical literature. Atavism has also recently been induced in avian dinosaur (bird) fetuses to express dormant ancestral non-avian dinosaur (non-bird) features, including teeth.

Examples of observed atavisms include:

- Hind limbs in cetaceans and sirenians.
- Extra toes of the modern horse.
- Reappearance of limbs in limbless vertebrates.
- Re-evolution of sexuality from parthenogenesis in oribatid mites.
- Teeth in avian dinosaurs (birds).
- Dewclaws in dogs.
- Reappearance of prothoracic wings in insects.
- Reappearance of wings on wingless stick insects and leaf insects and earwigs.
- Atavistic muscles in several birds and mammals such as the beagle and the jerboa.
- Extra toes in guinea pigs.
- Reemergence of sexual reproduction in the flowering plant Hieracium pilosella
- Webbed feet in adult axolotls.
- Human tails (not pseudo-tails) and supernumerary nipples in humans (and other primates).
- Color blindness in humans.

== Culture ==
Atavism is a term in Joseph Schumpeter's explanation of World War I in twentieth-century liberal Europe. He defends the liberal international relations theory that an international society built on commerce will avoid war because of war's destructiveness and comparative cost. His reason for World War I is termed "atavism", in which he asserts that senescent governments in Europe (those of the German Empire, Russian Empire, Ottoman Empire, and Austro-Hungarian Empire) pulled the liberal Europe into war, and that the liberal regimes of the other continental powers did not cause it. He used this idea to say that liberalism and commerce would continue to have a soothing effect in international relations, and that war would not arise between nations which are connected by commercial ties. This latter idea is very similar to the later Golden Arches theory.

University of London professor Guy Standing has identified three distinct sub-groups of the precariat, one of which he refers to as "atavists", who long for what they see as a lost past.

=== Social Darwinism ===
During the interval between the acceptance of evolution in the mid-1800s and the rise of the modern understanding of genetics in the early 1900s, atavism was used to account for the reappearance in an individual of a trait after several generations of absence—often called a "throw-back". The idea that atavisms could be made to accumulate by selective breeding, or breeding back, led to breeds such as Heck cattle. This had been bred from ancient landraces with selected primitive traits, in an attempt of "reviving" the aurochs, an extinct species of wild cattle. The same notions of atavisms were used by social Darwinists, who claimed that "inferior" races displayed atavistic traits, and represented more primitive traits than other races. Both atavism's and Ernst Haeckel's recapitulation theory are related to evolutionary progress, as development towards a greater complexity and a superior ability.

In addition, the concept of atavism as part of an individualistic explanation of the causes of criminal deviance was popularised by the Italian criminologist Cesare Lombroso in the 1870s. He attempted to identify physical characteristics common to criminals and labeled those he found as atavistic, 'throw-back' traits that determined 'primitive' criminal behavior. His statistical evidence and the closely related idea of eugenics have long since been abandoned by the scientific community, but the concept that physical traits may affect the likelihood of criminal or unethical behavior in a person still has some scientific support.

== See also ==
- Atavistic regression – Reversion to a more primitive mental state under hypnosis
- Evolutionary anachronism – Attributes of living species that arose due to coevolution with other now-extinct species
- Exaptation – Function of trait, shifted by evolution
- Devolution (biology) – Notion that species can revert to primitive forms
- Neofunctionalization – Genetic process
- Spandrel (biology) – Evolutionary byproduct of some other characteristic
- Torna atrás – Term describing a type of mixed race person
- Functional morphology – Study of the relationship between form and function in biology
