= Purple acid phosphatases =

Class of enzymes

Purple acid phosphatases (PAPs) (EC 3.1.3.2) are metalloenzymes that hydrolyse phosphate esters and anhydrides under acidic condition. In their oxidised form, PAPs in solution are purple in colour. This is due to the presence of a dinuclear iron centre, to which a tyrosine residue is connected via a charge transfer. This metallic centre is composed of Fe^{3+} and M, where M is Fe^{3+}, Zn^{2+}, Mg^{2+} or Mn^{2+}. The conserved Fe^{3+} is stabilised in the ferric form, whereas M may undergo reduction. Upon treatment with mild reductants, PAPs are converted to their enzymatically active, pink form. Treatment with strong reducing agents dissociates the metallic ions, and renders the enzyme colourless and inactive.

PAPs are highly conserved within eukaryotic species, with >80% amino acid homology in mammalian PAPs, and >70% sequence homology in PAPs of plant origin. However sequence analysis reveals that there is minimal homology between plant and mammal PAPs (<20%), except for the metal-ligating amino acid residues which are identical. The metallic nucleus of PAPs also varies between plants and mammals. Mammalian PAPs which have been isolated and purified have, to this point, been composed exclusively of iron ions, whereas in plants the metallic nucleus is composed of Fe^{3+} and either Zn^{2+} or Mn^{2+}. PAPs have also been isolated in fungi, and DNA sequences encoding for possible PAPs have been identified in prokaryotic organisms, such as in Cyanobacteria spp. and Mycobacteria spp.

Currently there is no defined nomenclature for this group of enzymes, and a variety of names exists. These include purple acid phosphatase (PAP), uteroferrin (Uf), type 5 acid phosphatase (Acp 5) and tartrate resistant acid phosphatase (TRAP, TRACP, TR-AP). There is, however, a consensus in the literature that purple acid phosphatase (PAP) relates to those found in non-mammalian species and tartrate resistant acid phosphatase (TRAP) to those found in mammalian species.

Uteroferrin, bovine spleen PAP and tartrate resistant acid phosphatase all refer to mammalian PAPs, whereby research on PAPs expressed in various tissues diverged. Subsequent research has proven that all of these enzymes are the same entity.
