= Hypnosis =

State of increased suggestibility

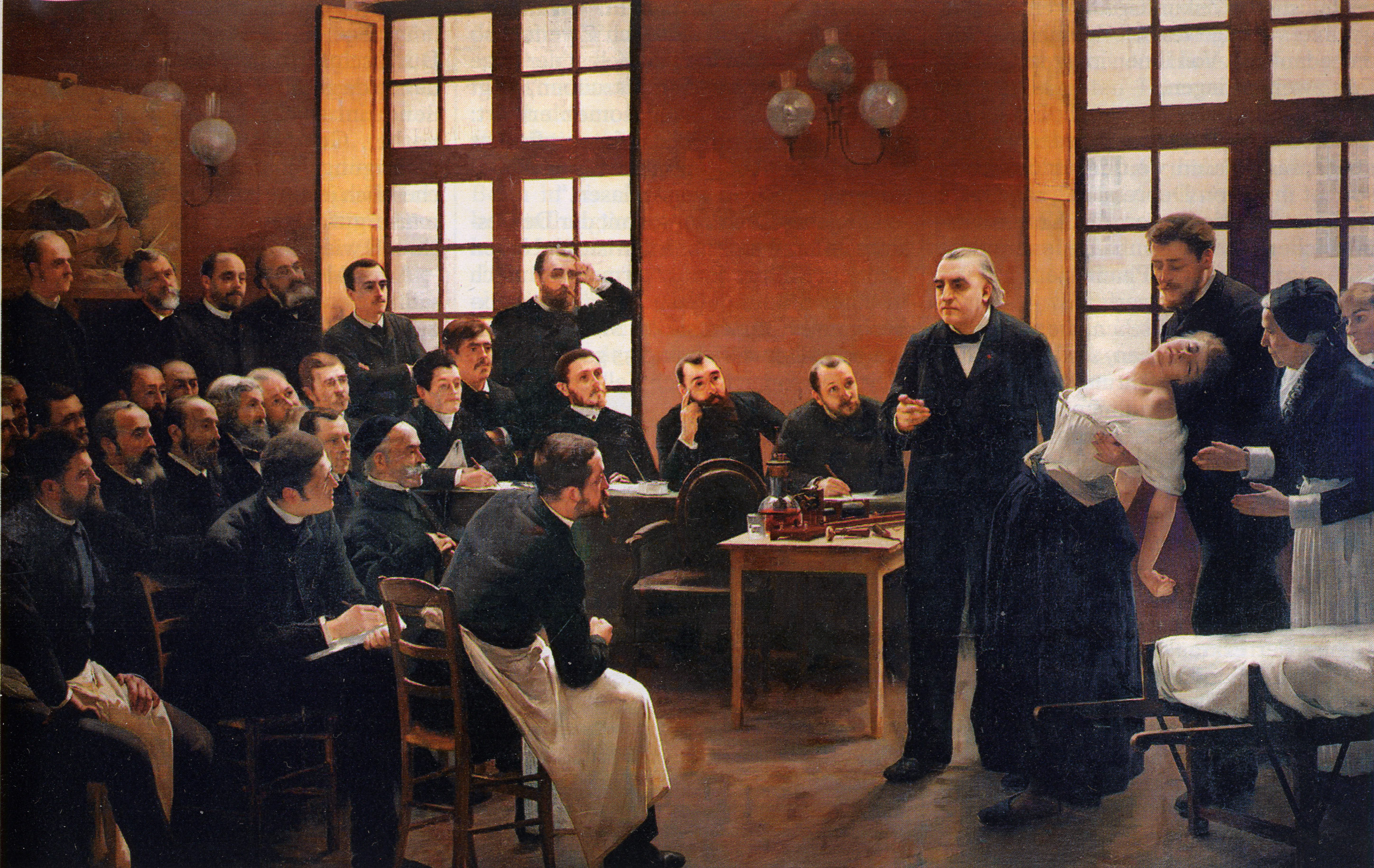
- Jean-Martin Charcot demonstrating hypnosis on a "hysterical" Salpêtrière patient, "Blanche" (Marie Wittman), who is supported by Joseph Babiński
- MeSH: D006990

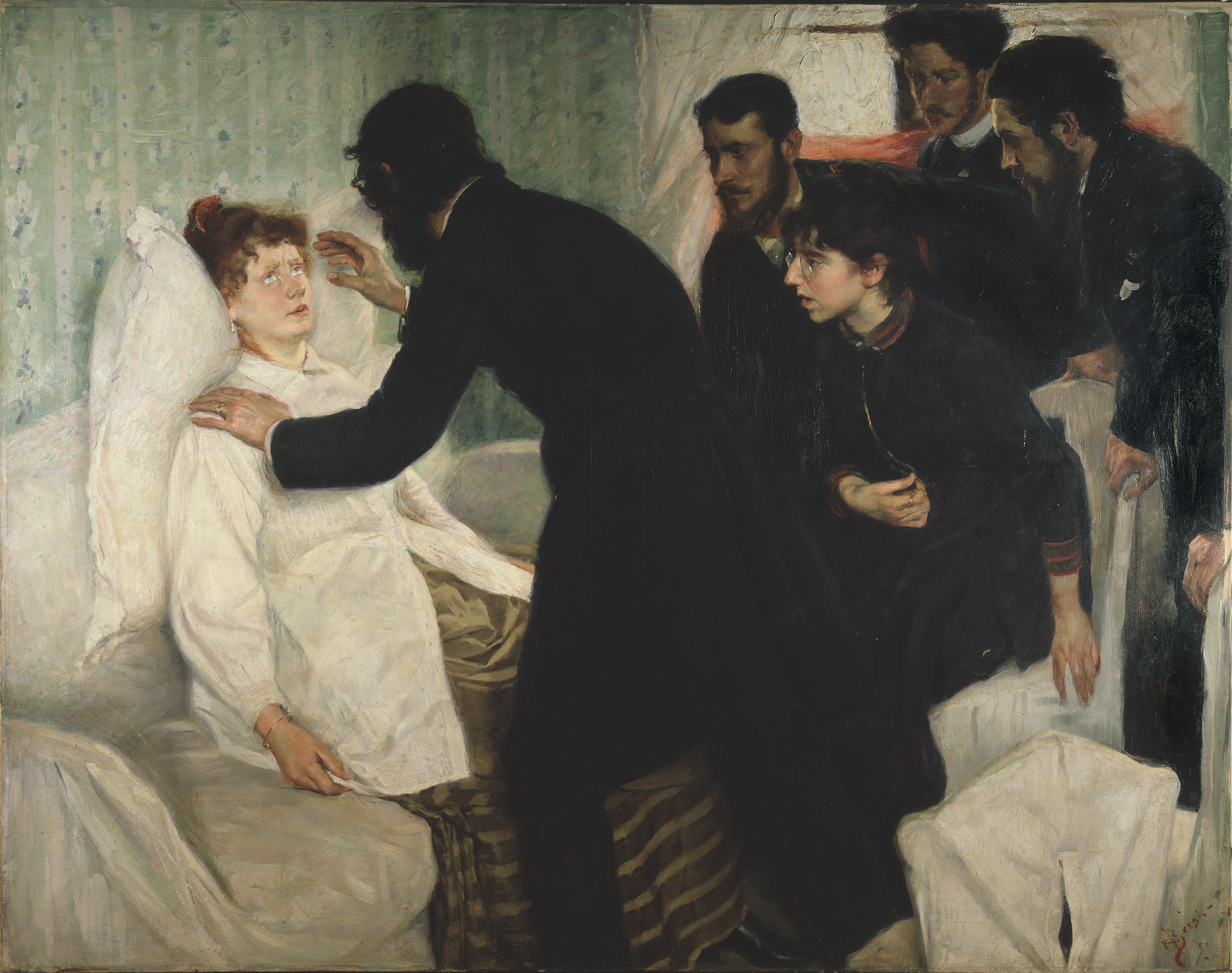
Hypnotic Séance (1887) by Richard Bergh

Photographic Studies in Hypnosis, Abnormal Psychology (1938)

Hypnosis is a human condition involving focused attention (the selective attention/selective inattention hypothesis, SASI), reduced peripheral awareness, and an enhanced capacity to respond to suggestion.

There are competing theories explaining hypnosis and related phenomena. Altered state theories see hypnosis as an altered state of mind or trance, marked by a level of awareness different from the ordinary state of consciousness. In contrast, non-state theories see hypnosis as, variously, a type of placebo effect, a redefinition of an interaction with a therapist or a form of imaginative role enactment.

During hypnosis, a person is said to have heightened focus and concentration and an increased response to suggestions. Hypnosis usually begins with a hypnotic induction involving a series of preliminary instructions and suggestions. The use of hypnosis for therapeutic purposes is referred to as "hypnotherapy", while its use as a form of entertainment for an audience is known as "stage hypnosis", a form of mentalism.

The use of hypnosis as a form of therapy to retrieve and integrate early trauma is controversial within the scientific mainstream. Research indicates that hypnotising an individual may aid the formation of false memories. Medical hypnosis is often considered pseudoscience or quackery.

A person who practices hypnosis is called a hypnotist.

== Etymology ==
The words hypnosis and hypnotism both derive from the term neuro-hypnotism (nervous sleep), all of which were coined by Étienne Félix d'Henin de Cuvillers in the 1820s. The term hypnosis is derived from the ancient Greek ὑπνος hypnos, "sleep", and the suffix -ωσις -osis, or from ὑπνόω hypnoō, "put to sleep" (stem of aorist hypnōs-) and the suffix -is. These words were popularised in English by the Scottish surgeon James Braid (to whom they are sometimes wrongly attributed) around 1841. Braid based his practice on that developed by Franz Mesmer and his followers (which was called "Mesmerism" or "animal magnetism"), but differed in his theory as to how the procedure worked.

== Definition and classification ==
A person in a state of hypnosis has focused attention, a deeply relaxed physical and mental state, and increased suggestibility.

The hypnotized individual appears to heed only the communications of the hypnotist and typically responds in an uncritical, automatic fashion while ignoring all aspects of the environment other than those pointed out by the hypnotist. In a hypnotic state an individual tends to see, feel, smell, and otherwise perceive in accordance with the hypnotist's suggestions, even though these suggestions may be in apparent contradiction to the actual stimuli present in the environment. The effects of hypnosis are not limited to sensory change; even the subject's memory and awareness of self may be altered by suggestion, and the effects of the suggestions may be extended (post-hypnotically) into the subject's subsequent waking activity.

It could be said that hypnotic suggestion is explicitly intended to make use of the placebo effect. For example, in 1994, Irving Kirsch characterized hypnosis as a "non-deceptive placebo", i.e., a method that openly makes use of suggestion and employs methods to amplify its effects.

A definition of hypnosis, derived from academic psychology, was provided in 2005, when the Society for Psychological Hypnosis, Division 30 of the American Psychological Association (APA), published the following formal definition:

Hypnosis typically involves an introduction to the procedure during which the subject is told that suggestions for imaginative experiences will be presented. The hypnotic induction is an extended initial suggestion for using one's imagination, and may contain further elaborations of the introduction. A hypnotic procedure is used to encourage and evaluate responses to suggestions. When using hypnosis, one person (the subject) is guided by another (the hypnotist) to respond to suggestions for changes in subjective experience, alterations in perception, sensation, emotion, thought or behavior. Persons can also learn self-hypnosis, which is the act of administering hypnotic procedures on one's own. If the subject responds to hypnotic suggestions, it is generally inferred that hypnosis has been induced. Many believe that hypnotic responses and experiences are characteristic of a hypnotic state. While some think that it is not necessary to use the word "hypnosis" as part of the hypnotic induction, others view it as essential.

Michael Nash provides a list of eight definitions of hypnosis by different authors, in addition to his own view that hypnosis is "a special case of psychological regression":

1. Janet, near the turn of the century, and more recently Ernest Hilgard ..., have defined hypnosis in terms of dissociation.
2. Social psychologists Sarbin and Coe ... have described hypnosis in terms of role theory. Hypnosis is a role that people play; they act "as if" they were hypnotised.
3. T. X. Barber ... defined hypnosis in terms of nonhypnotic behavioural parameters, such as task motivation and the act of labeling the situation as hypnosis.
4. In his early writings, Weitzenhoffer ... conceptualised hypnosis as a state of enhanced suggestibility. Most recently ... he has defined hypnotism as "a form of influence by one person exerted on another through the medium or agency of suggestion."
5. Psychoanalysts Gill and Brenman ... described hypnosis by using the psychoanalytic concept of "regression in the service of the ego".
6. Edmonston ... has assessed hypnosis as being merely a state of relaxation.
7. Spiegel and Spiegel... have implied that hypnosis is a biological capacity.
8. Erickson ... is considered the leading exponent of the position that hypnosis is a special, inner-directed, altered state of functioning.

Joe Griffin and Ivan Tyrrell (the originators of the human givens approach) define hypnosis as "any artificial way of accessing the REM state, the same brain state in which dreaming occurs" and suggest that this definition, when properly understood, resolves "many of the mysteries and controversies surrounding hypnosis". They see the REM state as being vitally important for life itself, for programming in our instinctive knowledge initially (after Dement and Jouvet) and then for adding to this throughout life. They attempt to explain this by asserting that, in a sense, all learning is post-hypnotic, which they say explains why the number of ways people can be put into a hypnotic state are so varied: according to them, anything that focuses a person's attention, inward or outward, puts them into a trance.

== Induction ==
Hypnosis is normally preceded by a "hypnotic induction" technique. Traditionally, this was interpreted as a method of putting the subject into a "hypnotic trance"; however, subsequent "nonstate" theorists have viewed it differently, seeing it as a means of heightening client expectation, defining their role, focusing attention, etc. The induction techniques and methods are dependent on the depth of hypnotic trance level and for each stage of trance, the number of which in some sources ranges from 30 stages to 50 stages, there are different types of inductions. There are several different induction techniques. One of the most influential methods was Braid's "eye-fixation" technique, also known as "Braidism". Many variations of the eye-fixation approach exist, including the induction used in the Stanford Hypnotic Susceptibility Scale (SHSS), the most widely used research tool in the field of hypnotism. Braid's original description of his induction is as follows:

Take any bright object (e.g. a lancet case) between the thumb and fore and middle fingers of the left hand; hold it from about eight to fifteen inches from the eyes, at such position above the forehead as may be necessary to produce the greatest possible strain upon the eyes and eyelids, and enable the patient to maintain a steady fixed stare at the object.

The patient must be made to understand that he is to keep the eyes steadily fixed on the object, and the mind riveted on the idea of that one object. It will be observed, that owing to the consensual adjustment of the eyes, the pupils will be at first contracted: They will shortly begin to dilate, and, after they have done so to a considerable extent, and have assumed a wavy motion, if the fore and middle fingers of the right hand, extended and a little separated, are carried from the object toward the eyes, most probably the eyelids will close involuntarily, with a vibratory motion. If this is not the case, or the patient allows the eyeballs to move, desire him to begin anew, giving him to understand that he is to allow the eyelids to close when the fingers are again carried towards the eyes, but that the eyeballs must be kept fixed, in the same position, and the mind riveted to the one idea of the object held above the eyes. In general, it will be found, that the eyelids close with a vibratory motion, or become spasmodically closed.

Braid later acknowledged that the hypnotic induction technique was not necessary in every case, and subsequent researchers have generally found that on average it contributes less than previously expected to the effect of hypnotic suggestions. Variations and alternatives to the original hypnotic induction techniques were subsequently developed. However, this method is still considered authoritative. In 1941, Robert White wrote: "It can be safely stated that nine out of ten hypnotic techniques call for reclining posture, muscular relaxation, and optical fixation followed by eye closure."

== Suggestion ==
When James Braid first described hypnotism, he did not use the term "suggestion" but referred instead to the act of focusing the conscious mind of the subject upon a single dominant idea. Braid's main therapeutic strategy involved stimulating or reducing physiological functioning in different regions of the body. In his later works, however, Braid placed increasing emphasis upon the use of a variety of different verbal and non-verbal forms of suggestion, including the use of "waking suggestion" and self-hypnosis. Subsequently, Hippolyte Bernheim shifted the emphasis from the physical state of hypnosis on to the psychological process of verbal suggestion:

I define hypnotism as the induction of a peculiar psychical [i.e., mental] condition which increases the susceptibility to suggestion. Often, it is true, the [hypnotic] sleep that may be induced facilitates suggestion, but it is not the necessary preliminary. It is suggestion that rules hypnotism.

Bernheim's conception of the primacy of verbal suggestion in hypnotism dominated the subject throughout the 20th century, leading some authorities to declare him the father of modern hypnotism.

Contemporary hypnotism uses a variety of suggestion forms including direct verbal suggestions, "indirect" verbal suggestions such as requests or insinuations, metaphors and other rhetorical figures of speech, and non-verbal suggestion in the form of mental imagery, voice tonality, and physical manipulation. A distinction is commonly made between suggestions delivered "permissively" and those delivered in a more "authoritarian" manner. Harvard hypnotherapist Deirdre Barrett writes that most modern research suggestions are designed to bring about immediate responses, whereas hypnotherapeutic suggestions are usually post-hypnotic ones that are intended to trigger responses affecting behaviour for periods ranging from days to a lifetime in duration. The hypnotherapeutic ones are often repeated in multiple sessions before they achieve peak effectiveness.

=== Conscious and unconscious mind ===
Some hypnotists view suggestion as a form of communication that is directed primarily to the subject's conscious mind, whereas others view it as a means of communicating with the "unconscious" or "subconscious" mind. These concepts were introduced into hypnotism at the end of the 19th century by Sigmund Freud and Pierre Janet. Sigmund Freud's psychoanalytic theory describes conscious thoughts as being at the surface of the mind and unconscious processes as being deeper in the mind. Braid, Bernheim, and other Victorian pioneers of hypnotism did not refer to the unconscious mind but saw hypnotic suggestions as being addressed to the subject's conscious mind. Indeed, Braid actually defines hypnotism as focused (conscious) attention upon a dominant idea (or suggestion). Different views regarding the nature of the mind have led to different conceptions of suggestion. Hypnotists who believe that responses are mediated primarily by an "unconscious mind", like Milton Erickson, make use of indirect suggestions such as metaphors or stories whose intended meaning may be concealed from the subject's conscious mind. The concept of subliminal suggestion depends upon this view of the mind. By contrast, hypnotists who believe that responses to suggestion are primarily mediated by the conscious mind, such as Theodore Barber and Nicholas Spanos, have tended to make more use of direct verbal suggestions and instructions.

=== Ideo-dynamic reflex ===
The first neuropsychological theory of hypnotic suggestion was introduced early by James Braid who adopted his friend and colleague William Carpenter's theory of the ideo-motor reflex response to account for the phenomenon of hypnotism. Carpenter had observed from close examination of everyday experience that, under certain circumstances, the mere idea of a muscular movement could be sufficient to produce a reflexive, or automatic, contraction or movement of the muscles involved, albeit in a very small degree. Braid extended Carpenter's theory to encompass the observation that a wide variety of bodily responses besides muscular movement can be thus affected, for example, the idea of sucking a lemon can automatically stimulate salivation, a secretory response. Braid, therefore, adopted the term "ideo-dynamic", meaning "by the power of an idea", to explain a broad range of "psycho-physiological" (mind–body) phenomena. Braid coined the term "mono-ideodynamic" to refer to the theory that hypnotism operates by concentrating attention on a single idea in order to amplify the ideo-dynamic reflex response. Variations of the basic ideo-motor, or ideo-dynamic, theory of suggestion have continued to exercise considerable influence over subsequent theories of hypnosis, including those of Clark L. Hull, Hans Eysenck, and Ernest Rossi. In Victorian psychology the word "idea" encompasses any mental representation, including mental imagery, memories, etc.

== Susceptibility ==
Braid made a rough distinction between different stages of hypnosis, which he termed the first and second conscious stage of hypnotism; he later replaced this with a distinction between "sub-hypnotic", "full hypnotic", and "hypnotic coma" stages. Jean-Martin Charcot made a similar distinction between stages which he named somnambulism, lethargy, and catalepsy. However, Ambroise-Auguste Liébeault and Hippolyte Bernheim introduced more complex hypnotic "depth" scales based on a combination of behavioural, physiological, and subjective responses, some of which were due to direct suggestion and some of which were not. In the first few decades of the 20th century, these early clinical "depth" scales were superseded by more sophisticated "hypnotic susceptibility" scales based on experimental research. The most influential were the Davis–Husband and Friedlander–Sarbin scales developed in the 1930s. André Weitzenhoffer and Ernest R. Hilgard developed the Stanford Scale of Hypnotic Susceptibility in 1959, consisting of 12 suggestion test items following a standardised hypnotic eye-fixation induction script, and this has become one of the most widely referenced research tools in the field of hypnosis. Soon after, in 1962, Ronald Shor and Emily Carota Orne developed a similar group scale called the Harvard Group Scale of Hypnotic Susceptibility (HGSHS).

Whereas the older "depth scales" tried to infer the level of "hypnotic trance" from supposed observable signs such as spontaneous amnesia, most subsequent scales have measured the degree of observed or self-evaluated responsiveness to specific suggestion tests such as direct suggestions of arm rigidity (catalepsy). The Stanford, Harvard, HIP, and most other susceptibility scales convert numbers into an assessment of a person's susceptibility as "high", "medium", or "low". Approximately 80% of the population are medium, 10% are high, and 10% are low. There is some controversy as to whether this is distributed on a "normal" bell-shaped curve or whether it is bi-modal with a small "blip" of people at the high end. Hypnotisability scores are highly stable over a person's lifetime. Research by Deirdre Barrett has found that there are two distinct types of highly susceptible subjects, which she terms fantasisers and dissociaters. Fantasisers score high on absorption scales, find it easy to block out real-world stimuli without hypnosis, spend much time daydreaming, report imaginary companions as a child, and grew up with parents who encouraged imaginary play. Dissociaters often have a history of childhood abuse or other trauma, learned to escape into numbness, and to forget unpleasant events. Their association to "daydreaming" was often going blank rather than creating vividly recalled fantasies. Both score equally high on formal scales of hypnotic susceptibility.

Individuals with dissociative identity disorder have the highest hypnotisability of any clinical group, followed by those with post-traumatic stress disorder.

== Applications ==
Hypnosis has been used as a supplemental approach to cognitive behavioral therapy since as early as 1949. Hypnosis was defined in relation to classical conditioning; where the words of the therapist were the stimuli and the hypnosis would be the conditioned response. Some traditional cognitive behavioral therapy methods were based in classical conditioning. It would include inducing a relaxed state and introducing a feared stimulus. One way of inducing the relaxed state was through hypnosis.

Hypnotism has also been used in forensics, sports, education, physical therapy, and rehabilitation. Hypnotism has also been employed by artists for creative purposes, most notably the surrealist circle of André Breton who employed hypnosis, automatic writing, and sketches for creative purposes. Hypnotic methods have been used to re-experience drug states and mystical experiences. Self-hypnosis is popularly used to quit smoking, alleviate stress and anxiety, promote weight loss, and induce sleep hypnosis. Stage hypnosis can persuade people to perform unusual public feats.

Some people have drawn analogies between certain aspects of hypnotism and areas such as crowd psychology, religious hysteria, and ritual trances in preliterate tribal cultures.

=== Hypnotherapy ===
Hypnotherapy is a use of hypnosis in psychotherapy. Physicians and psychologists may use hypnosis to treat depression, anxiety, eating disorders, sleep disorders, compulsive gambling, phobias and post-traumatic stress, while certified hypnotherapists who are not physicians or psychologists often treat smoking and weight management. Hypnotherapy is generally not considered to be based on scientific evidence, and is rarely recommended in clinical practice guidelines. Hypnotherapy was historically used in psychiatric and legal settings to enhance the recall of repressed or degraded memories, but this application of the technique has declined as scientific evidence accumulated that hypnotherapy can increase confidence in false memories.

Proponents of hypnotherapy claim it can have additive effects when treating psychological disorders alongside of scientifically proven cognitive therapies. The effectiveness of hypnotherapy has not yet been accurately assessed, and, due to the lack of evidence indicating any level of efficacy, it is regarded as a type of alternative medicine by numerous reputable medical organisations, such as the National Health Service.

=== Forensic hypnosis ===
The use of hypnosis to exhume information thought to be buried within the mind in the investigative process and as evidence in court became increasingly popular from the 1950s to the early 1980s with its use being debated into the 1990s when its popular use mostly diminished. Forensic hypnosis's uses are hindered by concerns with its reliability and accuracy. Controversy surrounds the use of hypnotherapy to retrieve memories, especially those from early childhood. The American Medical Association and the American Psychological Association caution against recovered-memory therapy in cases of alleged childhood trauma, stating that "it is impossible, without corroborative evidence, to distinguish a true memory from a false one." Past life regression is regarded as pseudoscience.

=== U.S. Military ===
A 2006 declassified 1966 document obtained by the US Freedom of Information Act archive shows that hypnosis was investigated for military applications. The full paper explores the potentials of operational uses. The overall conclusion of the study was that there was no evidence that hypnosis could be used for military applications, and no clear evidence whether "hypnosis" is a definable phenomenon outside ordinary suggestion, motivation, and subject expectancy. According to the document:

The use of hypnosis in intelligence would present certain technical problems not encountered in the clinic or laboratory. To obtain compliance from a resistant source, for example, it would be necessary to hypnotise the source under essentially hostile circumstances. There is no good evidence, clinical or experimental, that this can be done.

Furthermore, the document states that:

It would be difficult to find an area of scientific interest more beset by divided professional opinion and contradictory experimental evidence... No one can say whether hypnosis is a qualitatively unique state with some physiological and conditioned response components or only a form of suggestion induced by high motivation and a positive relationship between hypnotist and subject... T. X. Barber has produced "hypnotic deafness" and "hypnotic blindness", analgesia and other responses seen in hypnosis—all without hypnotising anyone... Orne has shown that unhypnotised persons can be motivated to equal and surpass the supposed superhuman physical feats seen in hypnosis.

The study concluded that there are no reliable accounts of its effective use by an intelligence service in history.

Research into hypnosis in military applications is further verified by the Project MKUltra experiments, also conducted by the CIA. According to Congressional testimony, the CIA experimented with utilising LSD and hypnosis for mind control. Many of these programs were done domestically and on participants who were not informed of the study's purposes or that they would be given drugs.

=== Self-hypnosis ===
Self-hypnosis happens when a person hypnotises oneself, commonly involving the use of autosuggestion. The technique is often used to increase motivation for a diet, to quit smoking, or to reduce stress. People who practise self-hypnosis sometimes require assistance; some people use devices known as mind machines to assist in the process, whereas others use hypnotic recordings.

Self-hypnosis is claimed to help with stage fright, relaxation, and physical well-being.

=== Stage hypnosis ===
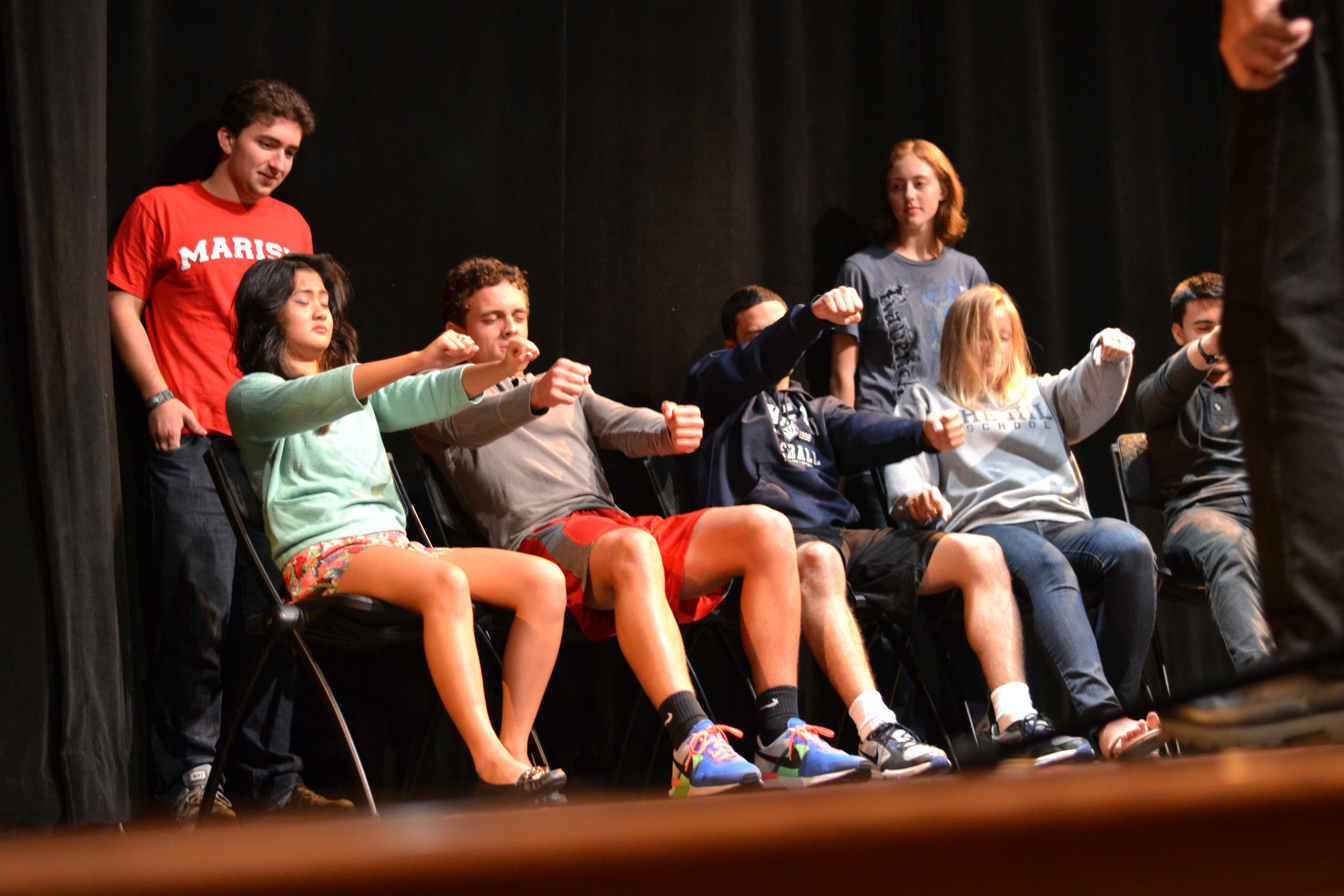
Participants acting out the driving of a car, during a stage hypnotism act

Stage hypnosis is a form of entertainment, traditionally employed in a club or theatre before an audience. Due to stage hypnotists' showmanship, many people believe that hypnosis is a form of mind control. Stage hypnotists typically attempt to hypnotise the entire audience and then select individuals who are "under" to come up on stage and perform embarrassing acts, while the audience watches. However, the effects of stage hypnosis are probably due to a combination of psychological factors, participant selection, suggestibility, physical manipulation, stagecraft, and trickery. The desire to be the centre of attention, having an excuse to violate their own fear suppressors, and the pressure to please are thought to convince subjects to "play along".

Books by stage hypnotists sometimes explicitly describe the use of deception in their acts; for example, Ormond McGill's New Encyclopedia of Stage Hypnotism describes an entire "fake hypnosis" act that depends upon the use of private whispers throughout.

=== Music ===
The idea of music as hypnosis developed from the work of Franz Mesmer. Instruments such as pianos, violins, harps and, especially, the glass harmonica often featured in Mesmer's treatments, and were considered to contribute to his success.

Hypnotic music became an important part in the development of a 'physiological psychology' that regarded the hypnotic state as an 'automatic' phenomenon that links to physical reflex. In their experiments with sound hypnosis, Jean-Martin Charcot used gongs and tuning forks, and Ivan Pavlov used bells. The intention behind their experiments was to prove that physiological response to sound could be automatic, bypassing the conscious mind.

=== Satanic brainwashing ===
In the 1980s and 1990s, a moral panic took place in the US fearing Satanic ritual abuse. As part of this, certain books such as The Devil's Disciples claimed that some bands, particularly in the musical genre of heavy metal, brainwashed American teenagers with subliminal messages to lure them into the worship of the devil, sexual immorality, murder, and especially suicide.

=== Crime ===
Various people have been suspected of or convicted for hypnosis-related crimes, including robbery and sexual abuse.

In a 1951 Copenhagen murder case, Palle Hardrup shot and killed two people during a botched robbery, then claimed that his friend and former cellmate Bjørn Schouw Nielsen had hypnotised him to commit the robbery, inadvertently causing the deaths. Both were sentenced to jail time.

In 2013, the then-40-year-old amateur hypnotist Timothy Porter attempted to sexually abuse his female weight-loss client. She reported awaking from a trance and finding him behind her with his pants down, telling her to touch herself. He was subsequently called to court and included on the sex offender list. In 2015, Gary Naraido, then 52, was sentenced to 10 years in prison for several hypnosis-related sexual abuse charges. Besides the primary charge by a 22-year-old woman who he sexually abused in a hotel under the guise of a free therapy session, he also admitted to having sexually assaulted a 14-year-old girl. In December 2018, a Brazilian medium named João Teixeira de Faria (also known as "João de Deus"), famous for performing Spiritual Surgeries through hypnosis techniques, was accused of sexual abuse by 12 women. In 2016 an Ohio lawyer was sentenced to 12 years of prison after hypnotizing a dozen different clients into committing sexual acts under the guise of a mindfulness exercise.

=== Sexual ===
Erotic hypnosis is a broad term for activities involving hypnotic suggestions applied to create arousal. Some erotic hypnosis is practiced in the context of BDSM relationships and communities, and is an example of a sexual fetish or paraphilia.

== State vs. non-state ==
The central theoretical disagreement regarding hypnosis is known as the "state versus non-state" debate. When Braid introduced the concept of hypnotism, he equivocated over the nature of the "state", sometimes describing it as a specific sleep-like neurological state comparable to animal hibernation or yogic meditation, while at other times he emphasized that hypnotism encompasses a number of different stages or states that are an extension of ordinary psychological and physiological processes. Overall, Braid appears to have moved from a more "special state" understanding of hypnotism toward a more complex "non-state" orientation.

State theorists interpret the effects of hypnotism as due primarily to a specific, abnormal, and uniform psychological or physiological state of some description, often referred to as "hypnotic trance" or an "altered state of consciousness". Non-state theorists rejected the idea of hypnotic trance and interpret the effects of hypnotism as due to a combination of multiple task-specific factors derived from normal cognitive, behavioural, and social psychology, such as social role-perception and favorable motivation (Sarbin), active imagination and positive cognitive set (Barber), response expectancy (Kirsch), and the active use of task-specific subjective strategies (Spanos). The personality psychologist Robert White is often cited as providing one of the first non-state definitions of hypnosis in a 1941 article:

Hypnotic behaviour is meaningful, goal-directed striving, its most general goal being to behave like a hypnotised person as this is continuously defined by the operator and understood by the client.

Put simply, it is often claimed that, whereas the older "special state" interpretation emphasizes the difference between hypnosis and ordinary psychological processes, the "non-state" interpretation emphasizes their similarity.

Comparisons between hypnotised and non-hypnotised subjects suggest that, if a "hypnotic trance" does exist, it only accounts for a small proportion of the effects attributed to hypnotic suggestion, most of which can be replicated without hypnotic induction.

=== Hyper-suggestibility ===
Braid can be taken to imply, in later writings, that hypnosis is largely a state of heightened suggestibility induced by expectation and focused attention. In particular, Hippolyte Bernheim became known as the leading proponent of the "suggestion theory" of hypnosis, at one point going so far as to declare that there is no hypnotic state, only heightened suggestibility. There is a general consensus that heightened suggestibility is an essential characteristic of hypnosis. In 1933, Clark L. Hull wrote:

If a subject after submitting to the hypnotic procedure shows no genuine increase in susceptibility to any suggestions whatever, there seems no point in calling him hypnotised, regardless of how fully and readily he may respond to suggestions of lid-closure and other superficial sleeping behaviour.

=== Conditioned inhibition ===
Ivan Pavlov stated that hypnotic suggestion provided the best example of a conditioned reflex response in human beings; i.e., that responses to suggestions were learned associations triggered by the words used:

Speech, on account of the whole preceding life of the adult, is connected up with all the internal and external stimuli which can reach the cortex, signaling all of them and replacing all of them, and therefore it can call forth all those reactions of the organism which are normally determined by the actual stimuli themselves. We can, therefore, regard "suggestion" as the most simple form of a typical reflex in man.

He also believed that hypnosis was a "partial sleep", meaning that a generalised inhibition of cortical functioning could be encouraged to spread throughout regions of the brain. He observed that the various degrees of hypnosis did not significantly differ physiologically from the waking state and hypnosis depended on insignificant changes of environmental stimuli. Pavlov also suggested that lower-brain-stem mechanisms were involved in hypnotic conditioning.

Pavlov's ideas combined with those of his rival Vladimir Bekhterev and became the basis of hypnotic psychotherapy in the Soviet Union, as documented in the writings of his follower K.I. Platonov. Soviet theories of hypnotism subsequently influenced the writings of Western behaviourally oriented hypnotherapists such as Andrew Salter.

=== Neuropsychology ===
Changes in brain activity have been found in some studies of highly responsive hypnotic subjects. These changes vary depending upon the type of suggestions being given. The state of light to medium hypnosis, where the body undergoes physical and mental relaxation, is associated with a pattern mostly of alpha waves. However, what these results indicate is unclear. They may indicate that suggestions genuinely produce changes in perception or experience that are not simply a result of imagination. However, in normal circumstances without hypnosis, the brain regions associated with motion detection are activated both when motion is seen and when motion is imagined, without any changes in the subjects' perception or experience. This may therefore indicate that highly suggestible hypnotic subjects are simply activating to a greater extent the areas of the brain used in imagination, without real perceptual changes. It is, however, premature to claim that hypnosis and meditation are mediated by similar brain systems and neural mechanisms.

Another study has demonstrated that a colour hallucination suggestion given to subjects in hypnosis activated colour-processing regions of the occipital cortex. A 2004 review of research examining the EEG laboratory work in this area concludes:

Hypnosis is not a unitary state and therefore should show different patterns of EEG activity depending upon the task being experienced. In our evaluation of the literature, enhanced theta is observed during hypnosis when there is task performance or concentrative hypnosis, but not when the highly hypnotizable individuals are passively relaxed, somewhat sleepy and/or more diffuse in their attention.

Studies have shown an association of hypnosis with stronger theta-frequency activity as well as with changes to the gamma-frequency activity. Neuroimaging techniques have been used to investigate neural correlates of hypnosis.

The induction phase of hypnosis may also affect the activity in brain regions that control intention and process conflict. Anna Gosline claims:

Gruzelier and his colleagues studied brain activity using an fMRI while subjects completed a standard cognitive exercise, called the Stroop task. The team screened subjects before the study and chose 12 that were highly susceptible to hypnosis and 12 with low susceptibility. They all completed the task in the fMRI under normal conditions and then again under hypnosis. Throughout the study, both groups were consistent in their task results, achieving similar scores regardless of their mental state. During their first task session, before hypnosis, there were no significant differences in brain activity between the groups. But under hypnosis, Gruzelier found that the highly susceptible subjects showed significantly more brain activity in the anterior cingulate gyrus than the weakly susceptible subjects. This area of the brain has been shown to respond to errors and evaluate emotional outcomes. The highly susceptible group also showed much greater brain activity on the left side of the prefrontal cortex than the weakly susceptible group. This is an area involved with higher level cognitive processing and behaviour.

=== Dissociation ===
Pierre Janet originally developed the idea of dissociation of consciousness from his work with hysterical patients. He believed that hypnosis was an example of dissociation, whereby areas of an individual's behavioural control separate from ordinary awareness. Hypnosis would remove some control from the conscious mind, and the individual would respond with autonomic, reflexive behaviour. Weitzenhoffer describes hypnosis via this theory as "dissociation of awareness from the majority of sensory and even strictly neural events taking place."

=== Neodissociation ===
Ernest Hilgard, who developed the "neodissociation" theory of hypnotism, hypothesised that hypnosis causes the subjects to divide their consciousness voluntarily. One part responds to the hypnotist while the other retains awareness of reality. Hilgard made subjects take an ice water bath. None mentioned the water being cold or feeling pain. Hilgard then asked the subjects to lift their index finger if they felt pain and 70% of the subjects lifted their index finger. This showed that, even though the subjects were listening to the suggestive hypnotist, they still sensed the water's temperature.

=== Social role-taking theory ===
The main theorist who pioneered the influential role-taking theory of hypnotism was Theodore Sarbin. Sarbin argued that hypnotic responses were motivated attempts to fulfill the socially constructed roles of hypnotic subjects. This has led to the misconception that hypnotic subjects are simply "faking". However, Sarbin emphasised the difference between faking, in which there is little subjective identification with the role in question, and role-taking, in which the subject not only acts externally in accord with the role but also subjectively identifies with it to some degree, acting, thinking, and feeling "as if" they are hypnotised. Sarbin drew analogies between role-taking in hypnosis and role-taking in other areas such as method acting, mental illness, and shamanic possession, etc. This interpretation of hypnosis is particularly relevant to understanding stage hypnosis, in which there is clearly strong peer pressure to comply with a socially constructed role by performing accordingly on a theatrical stage.

Hence, the social constructionism and role-taking theory of hypnosis suggests that individuals are enacting (as opposed to merely playing) a role and that really there is no such thing as a hypnotic trance. A socially constructed relationship is built depending on how much rapport has been established between the "hypnotist" and the subject (see Hawthorne effect, Pygmalion effect, and placebo effect).

Psychologists such as Robert Baker and Graham Wagstaff claim that what we call hypnosis is actually a form of learned social behaviour, a complex hybrid of social compliance, relaxation, and suggestibility that can account for many esoteric behavioural manifestations.

=== Cognitive-behavioural theory ===
Barber, Spanos, and Chaves (1974) proposed a nonstate "cognitive-behavioural" theory of hypnosis, similar in some respects to Sarbin's social role-taking theory and building upon the earlier research of Barber. On this model, hypnosis is explained as an extension of ordinary psychological processes like imagination, relaxation, expectation, social compliance, etc. In particular, Barber argued that responses to hypnotic suggestions were mediated by a "positive cognitive set" consisting of positive expectations, attitudes, and motivation. Daniel Araoz subsequently coined the acronym "TEAM" to symbolise the subject's orientation to hypnosis in terms of "trust", "expectation", "attitude", and "motivation".

Barber et al. noted that similar factors appeared to mediate the response both to hypnotism and to cognitive behavioural therapy, in particular systematic desensitisation. Hence, research and clinical practice inspired by their interpretation has led to growing interest in the relationship between hypnotherapy and cognitive behavioural therapy.

=== Information theory ===
An approach loosely based on information theory uses a brain-as-computer model. In adaptive systems, feedback increases the signal-to-noise ratio, which may converge towards a steady state. Increasing the signal-to-noise ratio enables messages to be more clearly received. The hypnotist's object is to use techniques to reduce interference and increase the receptability of specific messages (suggestions).

=== Systems theory ===
Systems theory, in this context, may be regarded as an extension of Braid's original conceptualisation of hypnosis as involving "the brain and nervous system generally". Systems theory considers the nervous system's organisation into interacting subsystems. Hypnotic phenomena thus involve not only increased or decreased activity of particular subsystems, but also their interaction. A central phenomenon in this regard is that of feedback loops, which suggest a mechanism for creating hypnotic phenomena.

=== Societies ===
There is a huge range of societies in England who train individuals in hypnosis; however, one of the longest-standing organisations is the British Society of Clinical and Academic Hypnosis (BSCAH). It origins date back to 1952 when a group of dentists set up the 'British Society of Dental Hypnosis'. Shortly after, a group of sympathetic medical practitioners merged with this fast-evolving organisation to form 'The Dental and Medical Society for the Study of Hypnosis'; and, in 1968, after various statutory amendments had taken place, the 'British Society of Medical and Dental Hypnosis' (BSMDH) was formed. This society always had close links with the Royal Society of Medicine and many of its members were involved in setting up a hypnosis section at this centre of medical research in London. And, in 1978, under the presidency of David Waxman, the Section of Medical and Dental Hypnosis was formed. A second society, the British Society of Experimental and Clinical Hypnosis (BSECH), was also set up a year before, in 1977, and this consisted of psychologists, doctors and dentists with an interest in hypnosis theory and practice. In 2007, the two societies merged to form the 'British Society of Clinical and Academic Hypnosis' (BSCAH). This society only trains health professionals and is interested in furthering research into clinical hypnosis.

The American Society of Clinical Hypnosis (ASCH) is unique among organisations for professionals using hypnosis because members must be licensed healthcare workers with graduate degrees. As an interdisciplinary organisation, ASCH not only provides a classroom to teach professionals how to use hypnosis as a tool in their practice, it provides professionals with a community of experts from different disciplines. The ASCH's missions statement is to provide and encourage education programs to further, in every ethical way, the knowledge, understanding, and application of hypnosis in health care; to encourage research and scientific publication in the field of hypnosis; to promote the further recognition and acceptance of hypnosis as an important tool in clinical health care and focus for scientific research; to cooperate with other professional societies that share mutual goals, ethics and interests; and to provide a professional community for those clinicians and researchers who use hypnosis in their work. The ASCH also publishes the American Journal of Clinical Hypnosis.

== History ==
The development of concepts, beliefs and practices related to hypnosis and hypnotherapy stretches back hundreds of years.

Although often viewed as one continuous history, the term hypnosis was coined in the 1880s in France, some twenty years after the death of James Braid, who had adopted the term hypnotism (in 1841) — which specifically applied to the state of the subject, rather than techniques applied by the operator — to contrast his own, unique, subject-centred, approach with those of the operator-centred mesmerists/animal magnetists who preceded him.

== In fiction and popular culture ==
Hypnosis has been a recurring theme in literature and popular culture since the nineteenth century, often associated with fascination, fear, and fantasy. A common and enduring way for writers to explain the trope of mind control in their works, early depictions drew on the mysterious aura of mesmerism and spiritualism, while later ones expanded to science fiction, crime thrillers, and horror. The vast majority of these depictions are exaggerated, and focus on negative stereotypes of either control for criminal profit and murder or as a method of seduction. Across decades, such portrayals rarely reflect clinical reality, emphasizing spectacle over scientific accuracy. The hypnotist, whether scientist, sorcerer, or spy, continues to embody society's anxieties about willpower, manipulation, and the boundaries of consciousness.

== See also ==
- List of hypnotists and list of fictional hypnotists

=== Historical figures ===
- Hippolyte Bernheim
- Alfred Binet
- James Braid
- John Milne Bramwell
- William Joseph Bryan
- Jean-Martin Charcot
- Emile Dantinne
- John Elliotson
- George Estabrooks
- Abbé Faria
- Ambroise-Auguste Liébeault
- Ainslie Meares
- Franz Anton Mesmer
- Mahmoud K. Muftić
- Julian Ochorowicz
- Herbert A. Parkyn
- Charles Lloyd Tuckey
- Otto Georg Wetterstrand
- Benny Hinn

=== Modern researchers ===
- Etzel Cardeña
- Alan Gauld
- Jack Stanley Gibson
- Ernest Hilgard
- Albert Abraham Mason
- Ainslie Meares
- Dylan Morgan
- David Spiegel
- Michel Weber
- Michael D. Yapko

=== Related subjects ===
- Brainwashing
- Covert hypnosis
- Guided meditation
- Highway hypnosis
- Hypnagogia
- Hypnoid state
- Hypnosis in popular culture
- Hypnosurgery
- Hypnotherapy
- Hypnotic Ego-Strengthening Procedure
- Ideomotor phenomenon
- List of ineffective cancer treatments
- Psychonautics
- Recreational hypnosis
- Royal Commission on Animal Magnetism
- Scientology and hypnosis
- Sedative (also known as sedative-hypnotic drug)
- The Zoist: A Journal of Cerebral Physiology & Mesmerism, and Their Applications to Human Welfare

== Bibliography ==
- Baudouin, C. (Paul, E & Paul, C. trans.), Suggestion and Autosuggestion: A Psychological and Pedagogical Study Based on the Investigations made by the New Nancy School, George Allen & Unwin, (London), 1920.
- Braid J (1843). Neurypnology; or The Rationale of Nervous Sleep considered in relation with Animal Magnetism. London: John Churchill.
- Braid, J. (1850), Observations on Trance; or, Human Hybernation, London: John Churchill.
- Braid, J. (1855), "On the Nature and Treatment of Certain Forms of Paralysis", Association Medical Journal, Vol.3, No.141, (14 September 1855), pp. 848–855.
- Brann, L., Owens J. Williamson, A. (eds.) (2015), The Handbook of Contemporary Clinical Hypnosis: Theory and Practice, Chichester: Wiley-Blackwell. ISBN 978-1-1190-5727-7
- Brown, T. (1851), Lectures on the Philosophy of the Human Mind (Nineteenth Edition), Edinburgh: Adam & Charles Black.
- Coates, James (1904), Human Magnetism; or, How to Hypnotise: A Practical Handbook for Students of Mesmerism, London: Nichols & Co.
- Gibson HB (1991). Hypnosis in Therapy. Psychology Press. ISBN 978-0-8637-7155-2.
- Glueck, B., "New Nancy School", The Psychoanalytic Review, Vol. 10, (January 1923), pp. 109–12.
- Harte, R., Hypnotism and the Doctors, Volume I: Animal Magnetism: Mesmer/De Puysegur, L.N. Fowler & Co., (London), 1902.
- Harte, R., Hypnotism and the Doctors, Volume II: The Second Commission; Dupotet And Lafontaine; The English School; Braid's Hypnotism; Statuvolism; Pathetism; Electro-Biology, L.N. Fowler & Co., (London), 1903.
- Lynn, Steven (1991). Theories of Hypnosis: Current Models and Perspectives. Guilford Press. ISBN 978-0-89862-343-7.
