= List of hypnotists =

Below is a list of famous hypnotists.

== Historical ==
- Étienne Eugène Azam
- Vladimir Bekhterev
- Hippolyte Bernheim
- Alfred Binet
- James Braid (surgeon)
- John Milne Bramwell
- Jean-Martin Charcot
- Émile Coué
- John Elliotson
- Dave Elman
- Milton Hyland Erickson
- James Esdaile
- George Estabrooks
- Abbé Faria
- Sigmund Freud
- Pierre Janet
- Edith Klemperer
- Ambroise-Auguste Liébeault
- Ormond McGill
- Franz Mesmer
- Albert Moll
- Julian Ochorowicz
- Herbert A. Parkyn
- Ivan Pavlov
- Morton Prince
- Marquis de Puységur
- Otto Georg Wetterstrand
- Alvaro Uribe Velez

== Contemporary ==
- Derren Brown
- Giucas Casella
- Boris Cherniak
- Kimberly Friedmutter
- Chris Hughes
- Barrie Leslie Konicov
- Kevin Lepine
- Robert Maxwell
- Paul McKenna
- Michael Newton
- Peter Powers
- Peter Reveen

== See also ==
- List of fictional hypnotists
