= Gil Boyne =

American hypnotherapist (1924–2010)

- Born: Mark Thomas Gilboyne; October 28, 1924; Philadelphia, Pennsylvania, U.S.
- Died: May 5, 2010 (aged 85); London, England, U.K.
- Occupations: Hypnotherapist, Stage Hypnotist

Mark Thomas Gilboyne (October 28, 1924 – May 5, 2010), nom de guerre Gil Boyne, was an American pioneer in modern hypnotherapy.

In addition to his own practice, his main focus was on the training of "lay" hypnotherapists in Glendale, California; and, over some 55 years, he trained thousands of hypnotherapists globally with his Transforming Therapy methods. Many of his students wrote books and created their own hypnotherapy training centers.

Mentored by Ormond McGill — with whom he collaborated for Professional Stage Hypnotism (1977) — he championed the accessibility of hypnotherapy and consistently fought against legislative efforts worldwide to restrict hypnosis to the purely medical professions, which had largely ignored the therapeutic value of hypnosis until Boyne, Milton Erickson, and Dave Elman.

== Early life and career ==
Mark Thomas Gilboyne was born in Philadelphia, Pennsylvania on October 28, 1924, to Mark Gilboyne (1903-1976) and Margaret Elizabeth Gilboyne (1908-1983), née Barratt. He had one sister, Margaret Dolores Gilboyne (1933-2005).

Raised in a deeply religious Irish-American Catholic family, his early schooling was religiously focused; something that influenced his spiritual beliefs throughout his life.

He served in the Navy in the Pacific theater during World War II, after which he was assigned to a therapeutic program based on psychoanalysis.

The program was largely ineffective, and his frustration with the approach, his spiritual and religious upbringing, and experience as a stage hypnotist led him to develop the transformative approach using hypnosis. Contemporary influences included Dave Elman, Milton Erickson, Fritz Perls' Gestalt Therapy and Carl Rogers' "unconditional positive regard".

== Hypnotism Training Institute ==
Gil founded and was the director of the Hypnotism Training Institute in Glendale. In 1976, he opened Hypnotherapy training center in the United States offering up to 250 hours of training, including a diploma-offering curriculum in professional hypnotherapy.

== Transforming Therapy ==
With his background and experiences and with influences by his contemporaries mentioned above, Boyne developed one of the first programs designed to train hypnotherapists in a regression-based approach. The resulting program, Transforming Therapy, was used for decades to train over 12,000 and possibly as many as 15,000 hypnotherapists globally. The Transforming Therapy method incorporated aspects of Regression Therapy and Gestalt Therapy as well as focusing on the self-healing power of the subconscious mind. It uses a compassionate spiritual approach that simplifies theory in the actual therapy and hones in on allowing the inner mind to construct its own solutions creatively. The approach is generally considered to be rapidly effective[3].

Boyne continued to train hypnotherapists for over 55 years, continuing to evolve many novel techniques in the field and imparting them to his students.

Boyne founded Westwood Publishing, one of the first publishers to focus on hypnotherapy-focused publications.

Boyne also founded the American Council of Hypnotist Examiners in 1980.

== Hypnotherapist to the Stars ==
From his Glendale offices near Hollywood, Gil worked with many actors throughout his career, including Sylvester Stallone, Lily Tomlin, and Dolly Parton. Such work often brought international media attention. He was also a technical director or advisor on several films and television series, including The Hypnotic Eye, Above and Beyond, and The Eleventh Hour.

In addition, Boyne reportedly worked with professional and olympic athletes and the US Green Berets.

== Awards and honors ==
- 1981: Honorary Doctor of Humane Letters, Newport University, Newport Beach, California
- 1982: Honorary Doctor of Humane Letters, University for Humanistic Studies, San Diego, California
- 1990: Lifetime Achievement Award, American Council of Hypnotist Examiners.
- 1992: Honorary Doctor of Philosophy, Transpersonal Psychology, Westbrook University, New Mexico
- 1992: American Eagle Leadership Award, American Council of Hypnotist Examiners
- 1996: One of Glendale's 100 Most Influential Citizens (Glendale News Press, Feb. 28)
- 1997: Honorary Life Member, New Zealand Hypnotherapists Association
- 1997: Fellowship award for Distinguished Service, Australian Academy of Hypnotic Science
- 1998: Post Graduate Diploma of Psychotherapy, Australian College of Clinical Hypnotherapy
- 2000: Inducted, International Hypnosis Hall of Fame, Valley Forge, PA.
- 2000: "MAN OF THE CENTURY", International Hypnosis Hall of Fame, Valley Forge, Pennsylvania.
- 2000: Fellowship, National Council for Hypnotherapy (UK)
- 2001: Fellowship Award for Exceptional Service, Korean Hypnotherapy Associates
- 2003: Lifetime Achievement Award, Royal Hong Kong Hypnotherapy Association
- 2007: Honorary Doctor of Religious Education, Lordland University, Bakersfield, California

== Professional Positions ==
- Director, Self Help Institute, 674 Crenshaw Blvd., Los Angeles, California WE5-9234
- Director, Hypnotism Training Institute of Los Angeles
- Founder and CEO, Westwood Publishing Company
- Founder and Director, Hypnotherapy Counseling Center
- Co-Founder, British Council of Hypnotist Examiners
- Executive Director, American Council of Hypnotist Examiners

== Bibliography ==
- Boyne, Gil, Transforming Therapy a New Approach to Hypnotherapy (August 1989) ISBN 978-0930298135
- Boyne, Gil, How to Teach Self-hypnosis (1987) ASIN B000E7ZVQM
- Boyne, Gil, "Success Programming For the Hypnotherapist" (June 1, 2007)
- Boyne, Gil, Hypnotherapy and Healing: The Mental, Emotional, and Spiritual Aspects of Healing and Pain Control (1988) ASIN B004FOVUFG
- Boyne, Gil, "Marketing Self-Hypnosis and Other Group Programs" (1988) ASIN B000MFDMY4
- Boyne, Gil, Hypnosis: New Tool in Nursing Practice (1982) ASIN B001AER1TS
- McGill, Ormond, Boyne, Gil, Professional Stage Hypnotism (1977) ASIN B0012TSE56
