= Lawrence Lipton =

American journalist (1898–1975)

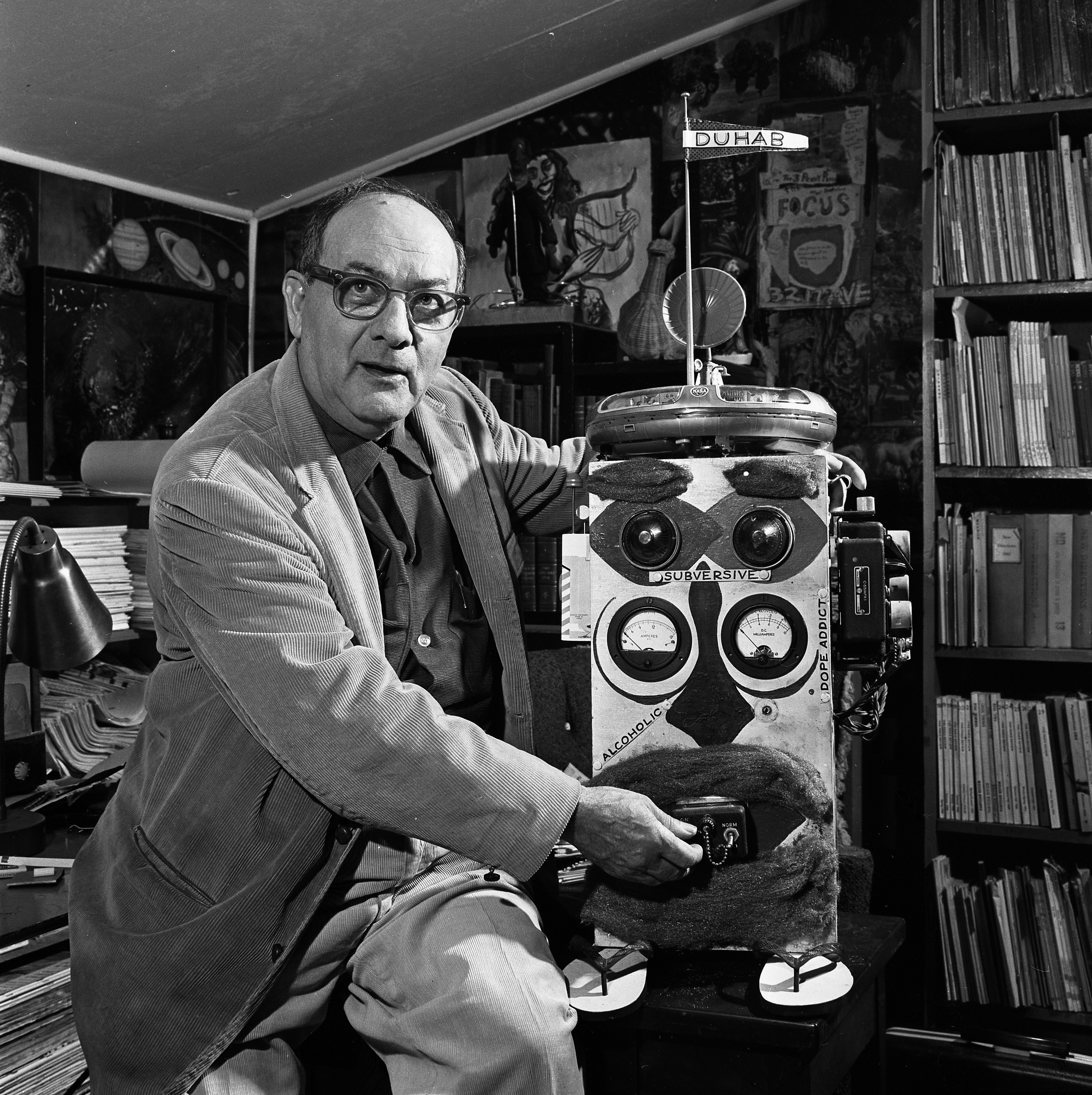
- Lipton and his "robot", 1965
- Born: 1898; Łódź, Poland
- Died: July 9, 1975 (aged 77); Los Angeles, California, U.S.
- Occupations: Journalist, writer, poet
- Spouse: Dorothy Omansky (divorced); Betty Weinberg (divorced); Craig Rice (divorced); Nettie Brooks (m. 1948)
- Children: James Lipton

Lawrence Lipton (né Lipschitz; 1898 – July 9, 1975) was a Polish-born Jewish American journalist, writer, and Beat poet, as well as the father of James Lipton. He is also known for coining the term Disneyfication in 1959.

== Early life ==
Lipton was born in Łódź, Poland, in 1898, the son of Rose and Abraham Lipschitz. He immigrated to the United States in 1903 and settled in Chicago, Illinois.

== Career ==
Lipton began his career as a graphic artist and won an award for his illustration of a version of the Haggadah, the Passover seder liturgical text. He also worked as a journalist, writing for the Jewish Daily Forward and working for a movie theater as a publicity director.

During the 1920s, he associated with Chicago writers Edgar Lee Masters, Sherwood Anderson, Harriet Monroe, Ben Hecht, and Carl Sandburg. Lipton later wrote for Atlantic Monthly, The Quarterly Review of Literature, and the Chicago Review. His other novels include Brother, The Laugh Is Bitter and In Secret Battle, as well as a poetry book, Rainbow at Midnight. His book The Holy Barbarians (1959) linked Lipton to the Beats as well as coined the term Disneyfication. He appeared in The Hypnotic Eye (1960) as "King of the Beatniks".

In April 1963, he was a panelist at the UCLA Arts Convention along with August Heckscher, Charles Eames, Richard Neutra, Aldous Huxley, Herbert Blau. It was hosted by the then-dean of the UCLA College of Fine Arts, William W. Melnitz.

In the episode "Swan Song" on the show Gilmore Girls, Rory is showing Jess her copy of The Holy Barbarians by Lipton, and says that he is "the father of the guy that does those Actors Studio interviews on TV", to which Jess responds "It's weird that a beatniky guy would have a conservative son like that."

The Holy Barbarians was also used as a band name for Holy Barbarians, a short-lived garage rock band from Liverpool, England, active from 1995 to 1997.

== Personal life ==
Lipton's first wife was Dorothy Omansky. He next married Betty Weinberg, a teacher; their son was Inside the Actors Studio host James Lipton. He was later married to author Craig Rice and Nettie Esther Brooks (from 1948 to 1975).

Lipton died in Los Angeles on July 9, 1975, at the age of 77.
