= Robert Pellegrini =

Robert J. Pellegrini is an American psychologist, Professor Emeritus of Psychology at San Jose State University. He has been president of the Western Psychological Association.

== Biography ==
He holds a BA degree from Clark University, and MA and PhD degrees from the University of Denver, He had pre-doctoral internships at the University of Colorado School of Medicine, Children's Asthmatic Research Institute and National Jewish Hospitals in Denver, and did post-doctoral work at Stanford University. He also held positions at SJSU as Associate Dean for Research, Director of Sponsored Programs, and Psychology Department Chair. He co-founded a BA degree program at the Correctional Training Facility in Soledad.

== Research ==
His initial research was on nonverbal measures of affect as indices of racial prejudice. He challenged as meaningless on quantitative methodological grounds the (early 1960s) widely quoted arguments of psychometric "experts" concerning statistically significant race differences in IQ scores. His later research included studies of the effect of color on human functioning in both laboratory and applied settings, studies of impression-formation, political identification and attributed causes of homelessness, the medical significance of adult attachment styles, the effects of anticipated opportunity on performance, and the storied roots of identity formation. In 1973 he did work on the correlation of male facial hair and perceptions of personality and masculinity.

Pellegrni authored and in 2010 published a fourth book, Identities for Life and Death: Can we save us from our toxically-storied selves?, and its associated Identities for Life and Death Forever Daily Message Calendar. In the book he posits "lifism" as a cognitive-affective-behavioral style that is creative and life-oriented which must overcome its opposite, the toxic "deathism" which is essentially dehumanizing and antagonistic to life.

== Publications ==
- Pellegrini, R. J. (1999) Bringing Psychology to Life. San Jose, CA: Canyon Ridge Press, 1996 ISBN 1-56018-999-1.
- Pellegrini, R. J. Study Guide To Accompany Uba/Huang's Psychology. New York: Addison Wesley Longman Publishers, Inc. ISBN 0-321-01213-5
- Pellegrini, R. J., and Sarbin, T. R. (Eds.) (2002) Between Fathers and Sons: Critical incident narratives in the development of men's lives. Binghamton, NY: The Haworth Press, Inc.ISBN 0-7890-1511-0).
- Pellegrini, R. J. (2011) Identities for Life and Death: Can we save us from our toxically Storied Selves. Peoria, AZ: Intermedia Publishing, (www.impbrbooks.com).
- Pellegrini, R. J. (2014) Education for the Joy of it: How To Thrive Not Just Survive In High School, College and Beyond. USA: AuthorHouse
