= Stage hypnosis =

Type of hypnosis before an audience

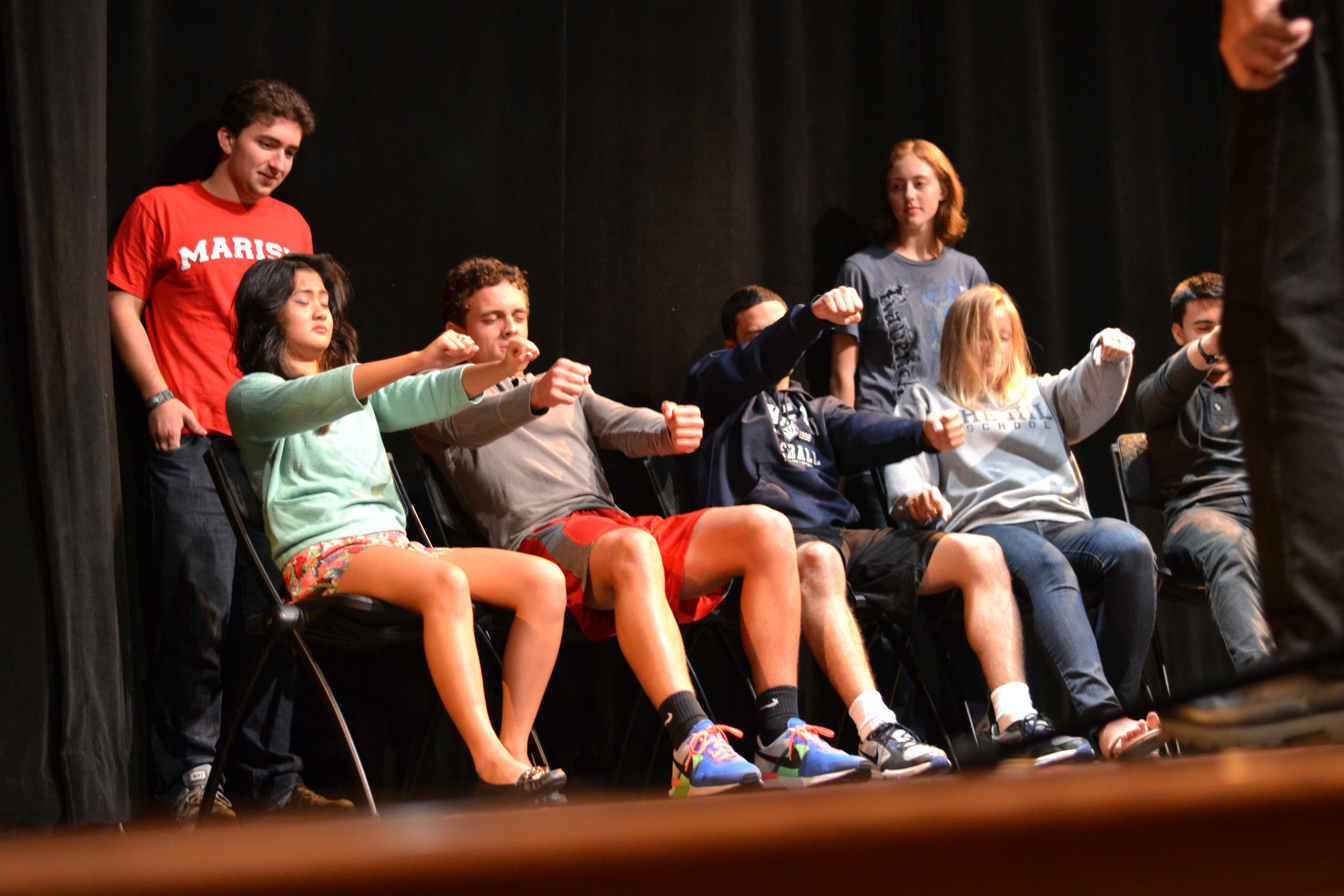
People acting out the driving of a car, during a stage hypnotism act

Stage hypnosis is hypnosis performed in front of an audience for the purposes of entertainment, usually in a theater or club. A modern stage hypnosis performance typically delivers a comedic show rather than simply a demonstration to impress an audience with powers of persuasion. Apparent effects of amnesia, mood altering and hallucination may be demonstrated in a normal presentation. Stage hypnosis performances often encourage audience members to look further into the benefits of hypnotism.

The causes of behavior exhibited by volunteers in stage hypnosis shows is an area of dispute. Some claim it illustrates altered states of consciousness (i.e., "hypnotic trance"). Others maintain that it can be explained by a combination of psychological factors observed in group settings such as disorientation, compliance, peer pressure, and ordinary suggestion. Some others allege that deception plays a part.

== History ==
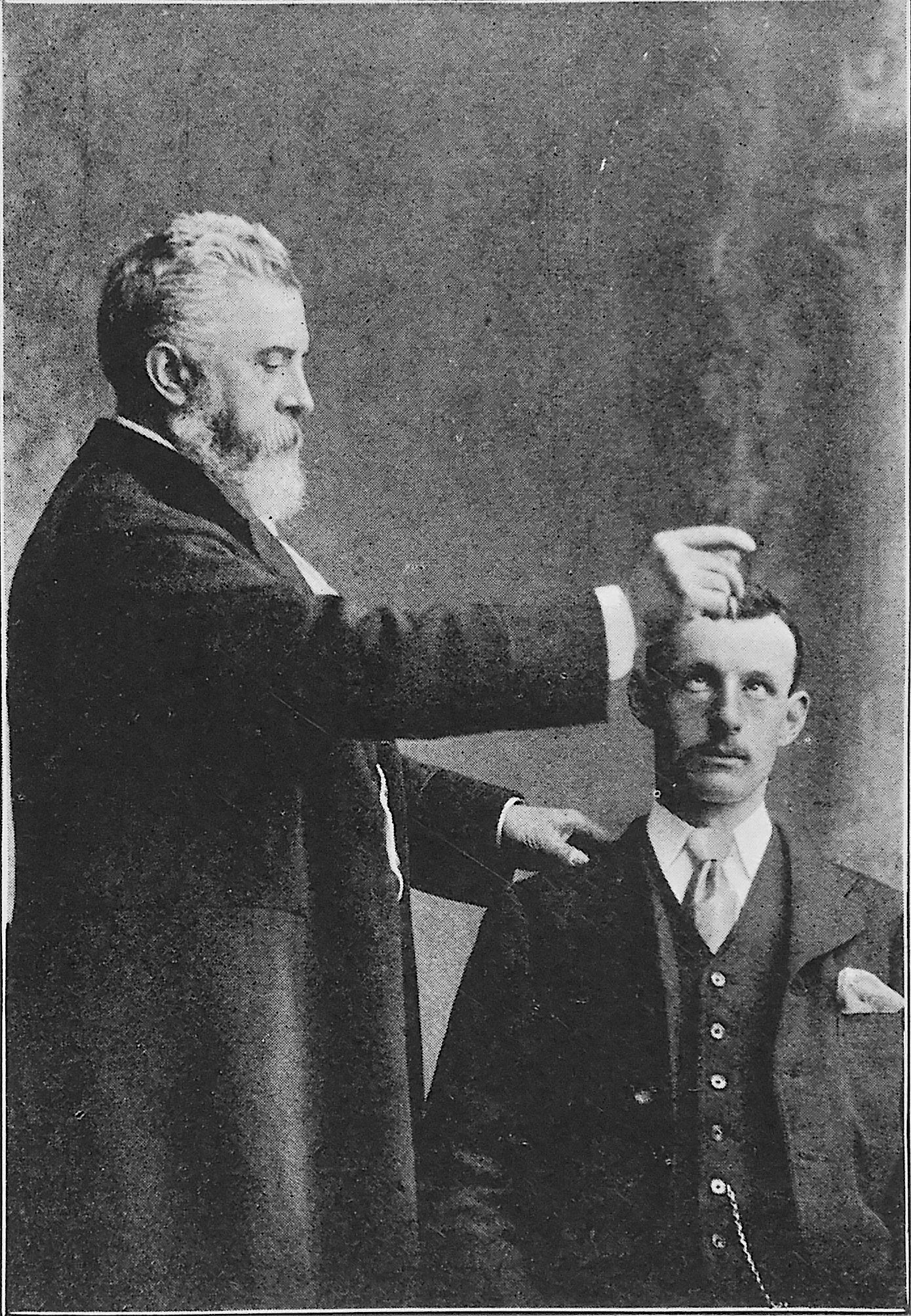
James Coates demonstrating Braid's "upwards and inwards squint" method of hypnosis, in 1904

Stage hypnosis evolved out of much older shows conducted by mesmerists and other performers in the 18th and 19th centuries. Scottish surgeon James Braid developed his technique of hypnosis after witnessing a stage performance by the traveling Swiss magnetic demonstrator Charles Lafontaine (1803–1892) in November 1841.

Braid was well aware of similar performances by "electro-biologists" in his day; e.g., Braid published the contents of an advertising hand-bill for an "electro-biology" performance by a visiting American, George W. Stone, on 12 March 1851, which, as well as clearly emphasizing that Stone was claiming to use volunteers from the audience, rather than his own stooges/assistants, details some of the phenomena that Stone's audience might have expected to have displayed to them.

Persons in a perfectly wakeful state, of well-known character and standing in society, who come forward voluntarily from among the audience, will be experimented upon. They will be deprived of the power of speech, hearing, sight. Their voluntary motions will be completely controlled, so that, they can neither rise up nor sit down, except at the will of the operator; their memory will be taken away, so that they will forget their own name and that of their most intimate friends; they will be made to stammer, and to feel pain in any part of their body at the option of the operator – a walking stick will be made to appear a snake, the taste of water will be changed to vinegar, honey, coffee, milk, brandy, wormwood, lemonade, etc., etc., etc. These extraordinary experiments are really and truly performed without the aid of trick, collusion, or deception, in the slightest possible degree.

These are identical to many of the demonstrations which became central to subsequent "stage hypnosis", in fact it seems that little changes except the name and the introduction of the hypnotic induction, etc. Likewise, the novelist Mark Twain similarly recounts a mesmeric performance which clearly resembles 20th century stage hypnosis, in his autobiography.

The absence of any reference to "hypnotism" in these early performances, indeed before the term was coined, and the fact that they often lacked anything resembling a modern hypnotic induction is consistent with the skeptical view, that stage hypnosis is primarily the result of ordinary suggestion rather than hypnotic trance. Indeed, early performers often claimed that they were influencing their subjects by means of telepathy and other supernatural powers.

Others, however, were delivering performances that displayed the wide range of hypnotic manifestations to their audiences. In the United States, for example, in the 1890s, there was a small group of highly skilled stage hypnotists, all whom were managed by Thomas F. Adkin, who toured country-wide, playing to packed houses. Adkin's group included Sylvain A. Lee, Mr. and Mrs. Herbert L. Flint, and Professor Xenophon LaMotte Sage.

=== 20th century ===
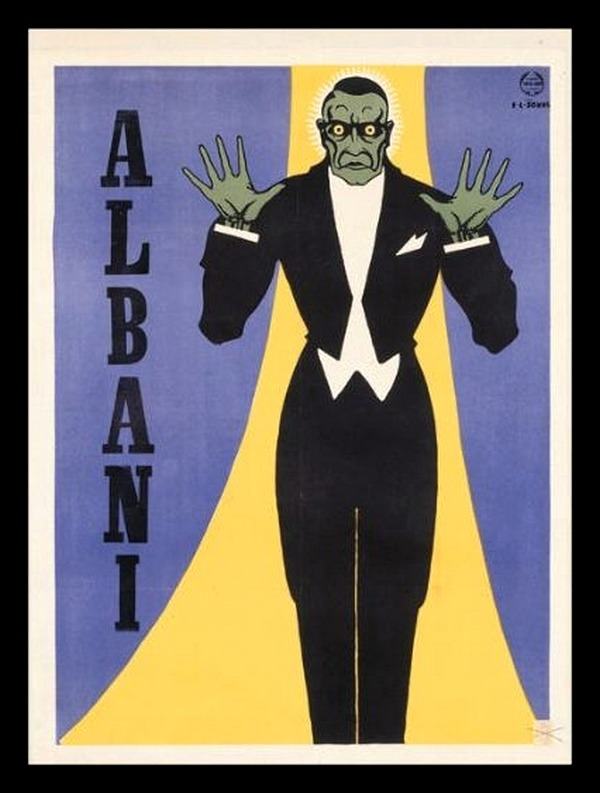
1919 poster for the hypnotist Albani

Throughout the 20th century, despite adopting the term "hypnotism", stage hypnotists continued to explain their performances to audiences by reference to supernatural powers and animal magnetism. Ormond McGill, e.g., in his Encyclopedia of the subject wrote in 1996 that:

Some have called this powerful transmission of thought from one person to another "thought projection". The mental energy used appears to be of two types: magnetic energy ... generated within the body and telepathic energy generated within the mind. ... The two work together as a unit in applying Power Hypnosis. The operation of the two energies in combination is what Mesmer referred to as "animal magnetism".

However, this is not what Braid meant by "hypnotism", a term coined in opposition to theories of mesmerism, to stress the fact that the results were due to ordinary psychological and physiological processes, such as suggestion and focused attention, rather than telepathy or animal magnetism. Indeed, after meeting with Mr. Stone, experimenting with his own subjects, and presenting his findings on such performances to the Royal Institution, Braid concludes,

There is, therefore, both positive and negative proof in favour of my mental and suggestive theory, and in opposition to the magnetic, occult, or electric theories of the Mesmerists and electro-biologists. My theory, moreover, has this additional recommendation, that it is level to our comprehension, and adequate to account for all which is demonstrably true, without offering any violence to reason and common sense, or being at variance with generally admitted physiological and psychological principles.

Stage hypnotism served as a central channel through which psychical research was introduced and disseminated in early 20th-century China.

== Skepticism ==
Mesmeric and other stage performances changed their names to "stage hypnotist" in the 19th century. They had originally claimed to produce the same effects by means of telepathy and animal magnetism, and only later began to explain their shows in terms of hypnotic trance and suggestion. Hence, many of the precursors of stage hypnosis did not employ hypnotic induction techniques. Moreover, several modern stage performers have themselves published criticisms which suggest that stage hypnosis is largely the result of sleight of hand, ordinary suggestion, and social compliance, etc., rather than hypnotic trance. Most notably, the well-known American magician and performer, Kreskin, has frequently carried out typical stage hypnosis demonstrations without using any hypnotic induction. After working as a stage hypnotist and magician for nearly two decades, Kreskin became a skeptic and a whistleblower from within the stage hypnosis field.

For nineteen years I had believed in ... the sleeplike "hypnotic trance," practicing it constantly. Though I had nagging doubts at times, I wanted to believe in it. There was an overpowering mystique about putting someone to sleep, something that set me and all other "hypnotists" apart. We were marvellous Svengalis or Dr. Mesmers, engaged in a supernatural practice of sorts. Then it all collapsed. For me anyway.

After experimenting with his own subjects for several years until he was satisfied he could perform "stage hypnosis" without any hypnotic induction or trance, he concluded, "The battle of semantics may be waged for years, but I firmly believe that what is termed 'hypnosis' is, again, a completely normal, not abnormal, response to simple suggestion." An outspoken skeptic regarding stage hypnosis, Kreskin not only actively debunked stage hypnotists' claims, but went so far as to offer a substantial monetary reward, $25,000, to anyone who could prove the existence of hypnotic trance. The reward has been unsuccessfully challenged three times. While debunking the "sleep-trance" concept, Kreskin, like other skeptics adopting the nonstate position, was keen to emphasize that he felt the value of hypnotic suggestion had been frequently underestimated.

== Role of deception ==
Due to stage hypnotists' showmanship, many people believe that hypnosis is a form of mind control. However, the effects of stage hypnosis are probably due to a combination of relatively ordinary social psychological factors such as peer pressure, social compliance, participant selection, ordinary suggestibility, and some amount of physical manipulation, stagecraft, and trickery. The desire to be the center of attention, having an excuse to violate their own inner fear suppressors and the pressure to please are thought to convince subjects to "play along". Books written by stage hypnotists sometimes explicitly describe the use of deception in their acts. For example, Ormond McGill's New Encyclopedia of Stage Hypnosis describes an entire "fake hypnosis" act which depends upon the use of private whispers throughout:

[The hypnotist whispers off-microphone:] "We are going to have some good laughs on the audience and fool them ... so when I tell you to do some funny things, do exactly as I secretly tell you. Okay? Swell." (Then deliberately wink at the spectator in a friendly fashion.)

According to experts such as Theodore X. Barber and André Muller Weitzenhoffer, stage hypnosis traditionally employs three fundamental strategies:

1. Participant compliance. Participants on stage tend to be compliant because of the social pressure felt in the situation constructed on stage, before an expectant audience.
2. Participant selection. Preliminary suggestion tests, such as asking the audience to clasp their hands and suggesting they cannot be separated, are usually used to select out the most suggestible and socially compliant subjects from the audience. By asking for volunteers to mount the stage, the performer also tends to select the most extroverted members of the audience.
3. Deception of the audience. Stage hypnotists are performers who traditionally, but not always, employ a variety of "sleight of hand" strategies to mislead their audience for dramatic effect.

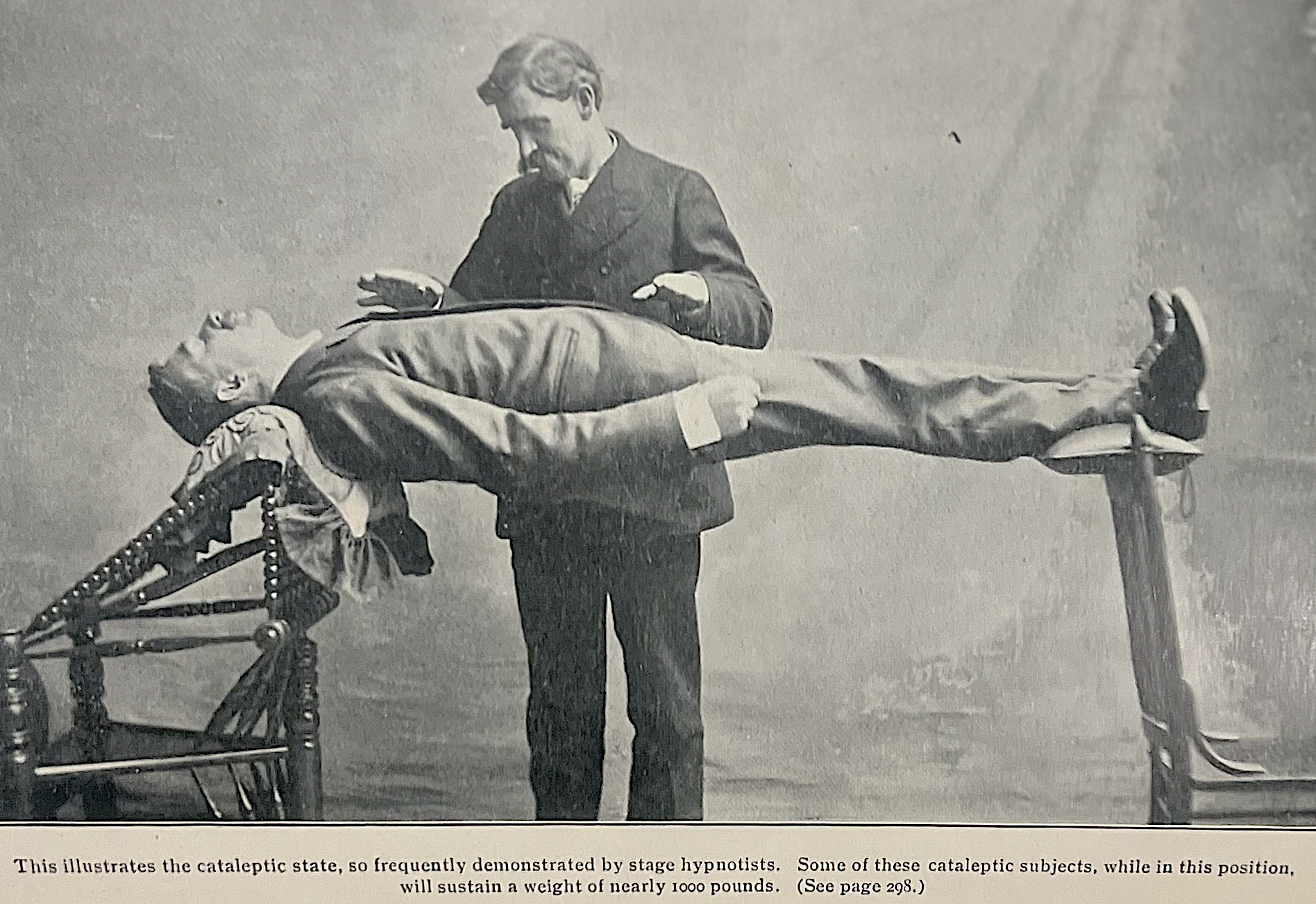
Catalepsy: "the human bridge"

The strategies of deception employed in traditional stage hypnosis can be categorized as follows:

1. Off-microphone whispers. The hypnotist lowers their microphone and whispers secret instructions to the participant on stage, outside the audience's hearing. These may involve requests to "play along" or fake hypnotic responses.
2. Failure to challenge. The stage hypnotist pretends to challenge subjects to defy a suggestion, for example, "You cannot stand up out of your chair because your backside is stuck down with glue." However, no specific cue is given to the participants to begin their effort ("Start trying now!"). This creates the illusion that a specific challenge has been issued and effort made to defy it.
3. Fake hypnosis tricks. Stage hypnosis literature contains a large repertoire of sleight of hand tricks, of the kind used by professional illusionists. None of these tricks requires any hypnosis or suggestion, but depend purely on physical manipulation and audience deception. The most famous example of this type is the "human plank" trick, which involves making a subject's body become rigid (cataleptic) and suspending them horizontally between two chairs, at which point the hypnotist will often stand upon their chest for dramatic effect. This has nothing to do with hypnosis, but simply depends on the fact that when subjects are positioned in the correct way they can support more weight than the audience tends to assume.
4. Stooges. Several experts, including Kreskin, have stated that stage hypnotists have been known to make use of stooges (also called horses) who travel from show to show. A stage hypnotist may only require a single stooge because by using them first for each demonstration real subjects from the audience will tend to follow their lead and imitate their responses. Moreover, for the climax of the show, the hypnotist will often focus on one or two subjects to demonstrate more difficult and dramatic responses involving apparent hallucinatory experiences. A single stooge can be used for this purpose.

Weitzenhoffer writes:

Having not only had a chance to watch famous stage hypnotists of the 1940s and 50s such as [Ralph] Slater and Polgar at work but having also had a chance to have fairly extensive personal contact with other stage hypnotists, I believe I can throw some light upon the situation. To begin with, one should be aware that many stage hypnotists use stooges or plants.

On the other hand, those who argue for a substantial "state" of hypnosis cite clinical claims (not actually evidenced in any case of stage performance, one hopes) such as the following:

"... editorial implying most subjects have no will or interest in not following the suggestion of the hypnotist, conveniently omit the primary interest in hypnotism came in the early 1800s before ether and morphine were widely available. Thousands of extremely painful operations were performed through the use of hypnosis. Patients awoke without memory of the surgery and even healed much faster than those who endured the extreme pain without hypnosis. Sigmund Freud was directly responsible for removing hypnosis from psychotherapy because of so many reports that patients also had intuitions about conditions of patients they had never met while in the trance state."

Such arguments originate in the work of James Esdaile at a medical mission in India, recounted in his book of 1847. This was before the concept of "hypnotism" (only recently promoted by Braid in 1843) had spread and Esdailes's work was still referred to as "Mesmerism". Whilst Esdaile claimed his patients felt no pain observers on behalf of an independent commission of inquiry for the Bengal government reported scenes of those undergoing such operations writhing in agony. Regarding more recent claims of painless surgery, Barber, among others, has pointed out that detail in accounts of such surgery admit that patients are, even though not unconscious, rendered stuporous by cocktails of anxiolytics. Moreover, the proportion of patients capable of undergoing such procedures (attaining sufficiently "deep" "hypnosis") is as small as the percentage of the population who are capable of undergoing surgery with neither chemical nor hypnotic assistance, inviting the suspicion that these groups of "special" patients overlap. Moreover, Barber also points out that invariably, cases of hypnotic surgery do use local anaesthetic at the area of incision, whilst internal organs are not capable of registering pain in response to a skilled cut rendering many such operations feasible without general anaesthetic, the role of hypnotic influence being essentially at an emotional or anxiolytic level. Furthermore, far from there being "thousands" of such cases of hypno-anaesthesia in surgery it remains sufficiently rare as to warrant the attention of news reports when it occurs. As rare, indeed, as the exceptional individuals able to undergo such surgery.

However, none of the foregoing debate about hypnotic procedures in a clinical setting has any bearing upon stage hypnosis.

== Role of hypnotist and subject ==
=== Hypnotist ===
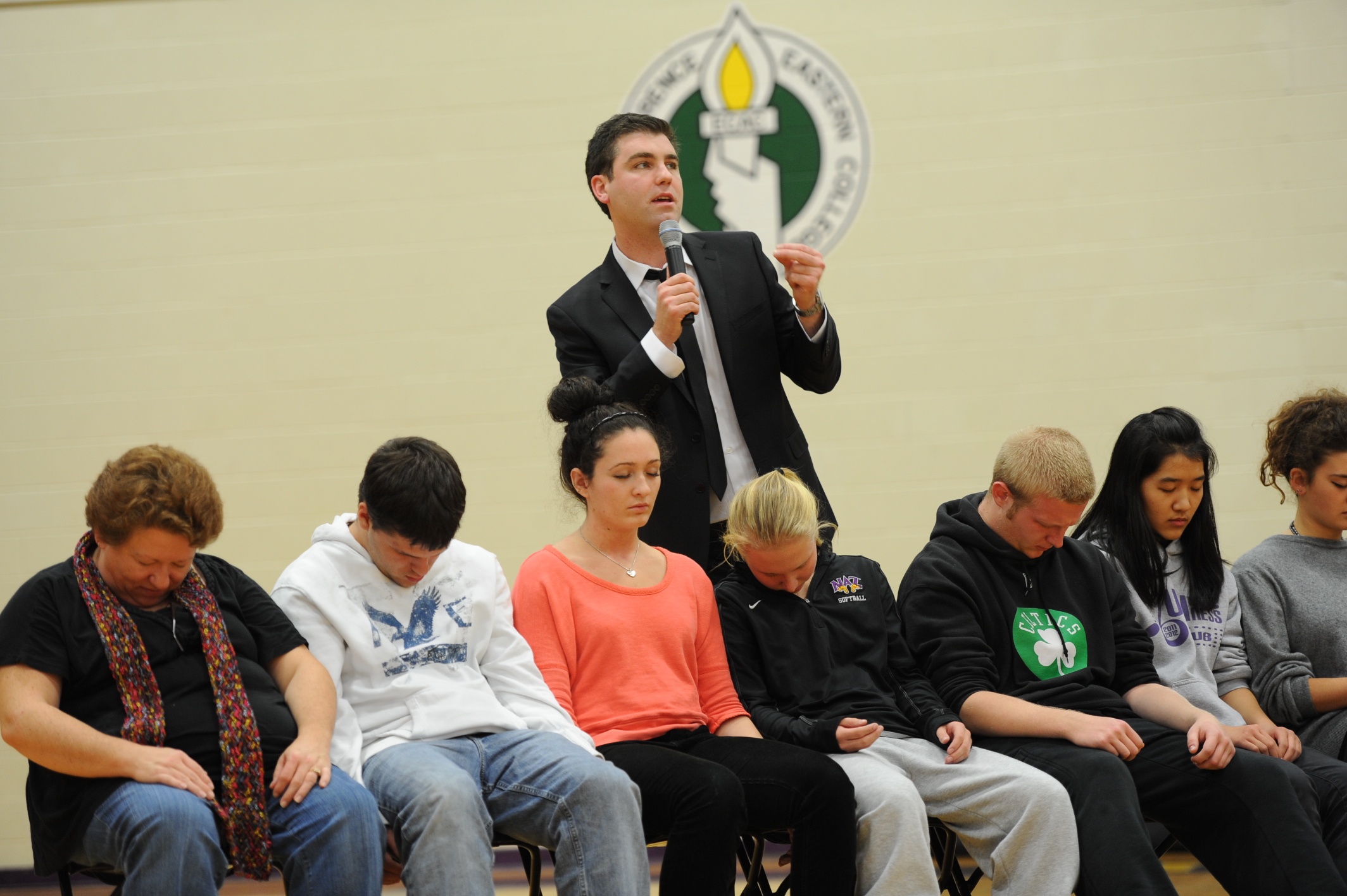
A stage hypnotist and his subjects

Due to stage hypnotists' showmanship and their perpetuating the illusion of possessing mysterious abilities, the appearance of a trance state is often interpreted as an "effect" of the hypnotist's "power". The real power of stage hypnosis comes from the trust the "hypnotist" can instill in their subjects. Subjects have to cooperate and be willing to follow instructions and the hypnotist will employ several tests to choose the best subjects. Some people are very trusting, or even looking for an excuse to abdicate their responsibilities and are apparently able to be "hypnotized" within seconds, while others take more time to counter their fears.

Suggestion is very powerful and a good hypnotist will know how to deliver suggestions that can create better entertainment for the audience. In his book Deeper and Deeper by Jonathan Chase, he talks about delivering suggestion, more importantly, The Super Suggestion a phrase he coined in his first published book in 1999:

"From this moment everything I say to you. Every single thing I say, no matter how silly or stupid it seems will instantly become your reality. Everything I say will instantly become your reality."

He emphasizes the use of repetition but warns that when they have accepted the suggestion then everything that the hypnotist says to them after this point will become an irresistible suggestion.

Historically, stage hypnotists often made claims for hypnotically induced enhancements to volunteer abilities beyond normal limits. One instance is "The Human Bridge," in which a hypnotized subject is supposedly put in a state of catalepsy and placed as a "bridge" between two chairs. The stunt looks impressive: however, as hypnotist Andrew Newton puts it: "Any reasonably strong adult can do this stunt without being hypnotized at all."

=== Subjects ===
In a stage hypnosis situation the "hypnotist" chooses their participants carefully. First they give the entire audience a few exercises to perform and plant ideas in their minds, such as

- only intelligent people can be hypnotized
- only those who are open-minded to being hypnotized and willing to participate.

It has been alleged that these suggestions are designed to overcome the natural fear of trusting a stranger with the greater fear of becoming an object of ridicule as one who is unintelligent, unsociable, and joyless.

Out of the crowd the hypnotist will spot people who appear trusting, extroverted and willing to put on a show. The hypnotist starts them off by having them imagine ordinary situations that they have likely encountered, like being cold or hot, hungry or thirsty then gradually builds to giving them a suggestion to do something that is totally out of character, such as tap dancing, singing like Elvis Presley, clucking like a chicken or forgetting a number.

The desire to be the center of attention, having an excuse to violate their own inner fear suppressors and the pressure to please, plus the expectation of the audience wanting them to provide some entertainment is usually enough to persuade some people to do almost anything. In other words, the participants are persuaded to 'play along'. Yet, whilst this accounts for some situations, it does not accord with those where hecklers, uncooperative audiences and those who wish to "disprove" the hypnotist create a set of negative expectations, uncooperative atmosphere and opposition which the performer must use skill to overcome.

== Law ==
In some countries, there are laws and guidelines regarding stage hypnosis. It is completely banned in Belgium, Israel and Norway.

In the UK, the Hypnotism Act 1952 governs the use of hypnosis in public. The original Act was amended in 1976 and again in 2003. In 1996 the government released "model conditions" which were refined and revised after consultation with the Federation of Ethical Stage Hypnotists (FESH) and with medical and academic psychologists. These model conditions have no legal force: they are suggested conditions which local authorities may or may not feel appropriate to impose or modify when regulating hypnosis. If stage hypnosis is performed at a public venue a permit (permission) must be acquired from the local authority and the local authority is advised to monitor the performance to ensure that its guidelines are followed. It is illegal to hold any form of stage hypnosis in a public venue unless the local authority has issued their consent for this.

In the accompanying circular announcing the revised model conditions in 1996 it was conceded that, as asserted by skeptical stage hypnotist Alex Tsander during the consultation process:

"In practice volunteers do not react as if they truly believe that there is, for example, a giant spider behind them or a bomb under their chair."

This was a critical point of distinction and represents a formal recognition of the "as if" nature of behavior in stage hypnotism in contradistinction to claims for its supposed subjective reality.

In the past, stage hypnosis has been banned in several countries in the world including Denmark and some states in the United States. Most of these countries have revoked these laws or do not enforce them. In Israel, it remains illegal to perform any kind of hypnosis without a license given to doctors, dentists and psychologists. In Belgium, stage hypnosis has been forbidden since 1892; the law was mentioned in 2017 to force the cancellation of a spectacle by Messmer.
