= Nicholas Spanos =

American psychologist (1942–1994)

Nicholas Peter Spanos
- Born: 1942
- Died: 6 June 1994 (aged 51–52); Edgartown, Massachusetts
- Education: Boston University, Northeastern University
- Known for: Study of hypnosis, skepticism, debunking conspiracy theories
- Scientific career
- Fields: Hypnosis
- Workplaces: Carleton University

Nicholas Peter Spanos (1942 – June 6, 1994), was professor of psychology and director of the Laboratory for Experimental Hypnosis at Carleton University from 1975 to his death in a single engine plane crash on June 6, 1994. Spanos conducted multiple studies that challenged common beliefs. He tried to distinguish the difference between common beliefs about hypnosis and what was actually occurring. These studies conducted by Spanos led to the modern understanding that hypnosis is not an altered state and is actually suggested behaviors that the participant chooses to go along with or not. Along with this, Spanos conducted studies regarding dissociative identity disorder in which he stated that multiple personalities are not a product of trauma but are based on social norms.

== Biography ==
He was an American by birth and received his B.A. and Ph.D. degrees from Boston University. He practiced at Medfield State Hospital and with Boston Psychological Associates before joining the Department of Psychology at Carleton in 1975. He wrote 183 journal articles and 19 chapters for textbooks during his career there. He also wrote for Skeptical Inquirer. During this time he contributed to many different studies, one study was the idea that hypnosis is not a trance like state, and another dealt with dissociative identity disorder, which tries to explain why some people have multiple personalities. Through his studies Spanos took an alternative approach to most psychologists and John Chaves and Bill Jones stated that he believed these two areas are, "rule-governed social constructions established, legitimated, and maintained through social interaction.

== Hypnosis ==
=== Nonstate position ===
Spanos hypothesized that the behaviors and experiences associated with hypnosis are acted out in accordance with the social context and expectations of the hypnotist and the setting by the person undergoing hypnosis even though they may be sometimes experienced as involuntary. He argued persistently and demonstrated in over 250 experimental studies that hypnotic acts are strongly influenced by the definition of the contexts in which they occur as well as by the cognitive interpretation of the person hypnotized. Spanos argued against Hilgard’s (and others') belief that hypnosis is an altered state of consciousness or a "special" or dissociated state of consciousness. Spanos worked for almost thirty years on this theory, first at the Medfield Foundation with Theodore X. Barber, John Chaves and others, and later at Carleton University in Canada. He argued that many of the actions performed under hypnosis can be simply explained by reference to social psychological and cognitive hypotheses (Spanos, 1996).

Spanos alleged that there are two reasons why people misconstrue their state of consciousness as hypnosis. One being that people believe their behavior is caused by an external source instead of the self. The second is related to the way hypnotic rituals are performed. The hypnotist says certain things which are first interpreted as voluntary and then later on in the procedure as involuntary. An example being “relax the muscles in your legs” and then later “your legs feel limp and heavy.”

Spanos argued that the hypnotist asks each person two connected requests. The first directly asking the subject to do something and the second being for the subject to infer the request as an involuntary one. Some hypnosis participants follow the first request and realize they are performing the task voluntarily while others do not respond at all. Still others follow both requests and therefore deemed great hypnosis subjects.

Using another study, Spanos demonstrates that people control their hypnotic experience by acting how they believe they are supposed to act during a hypnosis session. The study was performed on two groups of people. One group was given a lecture which included a segment on how arm rigidity was spontaneous during hypnosis and the second group did not. When both groups underwent hypnosis the group who was informed of the arm rigidity demonstrated arm rigidity during the session. A second study used by Spanos involved evaluating the analgesia effect in hypnotic and non-hypnotic individuals. The study performed the experiment on two groups of people and the only difference between the groups is that one group was told they were going to be hypnotized. Each participant was asked to put his or her hand in a bucket of ice and hold it there as long as possible. After removing their arm they were asked to rate their perceived pain. Without hypnosis, those individuals who were expecting hypnosis had a much higher pain rating than those who were not expecting. All participants were 'hypnotized' and then were asked to put their arm in the bucket of ice once more. The people who were not expecting hypnosis had about the same rating of perceived pain as their corresponding non-hypnotic trial. The expecting participants had a much lower rating than their corresponding non-hypnotic trial. Spanos claimed that this was due to the subjects wanting to be viewed as a great hypnotic subject. Spanos’ findings were to contribute to the view that the hypnotic state did not exist at all, and that the behaviors exhibited by those individuals are in fact due to their being “highly motivated”.

== Dissociative identity disorder ==
Spanos also contributed to the study of dissociative identity disorder through his proposal of the sociocognitive model. He proposed that exhibiting multiple identities is a social role based upon the norms of a given culture, that it is an attention seeking behaviour reinforced by therapists through hypnosis, which Spanos describes as "highly reminiscent of Catholic exorcism procedures." According to Spanos, hypnosis, spirit possession, and multiple personalities are similar phenomena that represent socially controlled behavior rather than special dissociative or trance states; like other social behaviors, they are learned through observation and interaction within a culture. The sociocognitive explanation for dissociative identity disorder is accepted by some but rejected by others who believe that multiple personalities result from severe trauma and cause a distinct psychological state, citing the fact that the majority of DID patients did not face hypnosis as part of their treatment and that phenomena like spirit possession and hypnosis have not been observed to cause essential diagnostic criteria such as amnesia.

== Selected bibliography ==
- Spanos, N. P. (1994). Multiple identity enactments and multiple personality disorder: A sociocognitive perspective. Psychological Bulletin, 116, 143–165. doi:10.1037/0033-2909.116.1.143
- Spanos, N. P. (1996). Multiple Identities & False Memories: A Sociocognitive Perspective. Washington: American Psychological Association.
