= Theodore X. Barber =

American hypnosis expert

Theodore Xenophon Barber
- Born: 1927; Martins Ferry, Ohio
- Died: 2005 (aged 77–78); Framingham, Massachusetts
- Education: St. John's College, Maryland, American University
- Occupations: Psychologist, Researcher
- Years active: 1961–2005
- Known for: Hypnosis Theory, Psychology, Philosophy of Consciousness
- Children: X. Theodore Barber, Elaine Barber and Rania Richardson

Theodore Xenophon Barber (1927–2005) was an American psychologist who researched and wrote on the subject of hypnosis, publishing over 200 articles and eight books on that and related topics. He was the chief psychologist at Cushing Hospital, Framingham, Massachusetts, from 1978 to 1986. Barber was a noted critic of the field of hypnosis, questioning the ways in which the concept of hypnosis had been used as an umbrella term for diverse phenomena. Barber was one of the first two prominent anglophone psychologists, along with Theodore Sarbin, to question the "altered-state model" of "state model" of hypnosis, arguing that the varied phenomena labeled "hypnosis" could be explained without resorting to the notion of an altered state of consciousness.

== Life ==
Born in 1927 to Greek immigrant parents in Martins Ferry, Ohio, Barber graduated early from high school and then attended St. John's College in Maryland. He earned his doctorate in psychology at American University (1956) in Washington, D.C., and then moved to Boston to complete postdoctoral research in the Department of Social Relations at Harvard with Clyde Kluckhohn and William A. Caudill.

After working as a research associate at the Worcester Foundation for Experimental Biology, he joined the staff of the Medfield Foundation in 1961. Barber was director of research for the Foundation and served as chief psychologist for the hospital. His research was continuously supported through this period by grants from the National Institutes of Health. In 1978 he became a chief psychologist at the Cushing Hospital in Framingham, Massachusetts, where he remained until his retirement in 1986.

At Medfield, Barber established one of the most vital and productive centers for hypnosis research in the world. He held adjunct appointments at Harvard and Boston University and attracted a number of research assistants and associates, postdoctoral fellows, and visiting scholars to Medfield. With these colleagues, he published more than 200 scholarly papers and 8 books. Hypnosis: A Scientific Approach (1969) became a classic and remains the best summary of his early experimental work for the scientific community. A later volume, coauthored with Nicholas P. Spanos and John F. Chaves, Hypnosis, Imagination, and Human Potentialities (1974), brought much of this material to a wider audience.

Barber had a son X. Theodore Barber and two daughters Elaine Barber and Rania Richardson.

== Major works ==
=== Hypnosis ===
Barber's most referenced book is Hypnosis: A Scientific Approach (1969). He argued in this work that hypnosis and related constructs are "unnecessary and misleading and that the phenomena that have been traditionally subsumed under these terms can be better understood by utilizing a different set of concepts that are an integral part of present-day psychology." It was positively reviewed by the scientific community. Psychologist Theodore R. Sarbin noted that the work "demystifies and demythologizes" the subject, "the construction of hypnosis as a special mental state ha[s] no ontological footing."

Throughout his numerous articles and research programs, he argued that diverse variables affected hypnotic responsiveness and that hypnosis could be elicited without any hypnotic induction at all. He posited that contextual variables—like merely defining a situation as hypnotic or inducing goal-directed behavior—served as a theoretical basis for hypnosis. His research showed that merely priming a subject to expect to be hypnotized could produce hypnotic results, and he found that a subject's score on a hypnotic suggestibility scale could be increased through both motivation and expectation.

At first perceived as an iconoclast or "hypnosis opponent," his research and views came to be taken more seriously by the psychological community.

Those who embraced traditional views of hypnosis as an altered state of consciousness were displeased by Barber's habit of placing quotation marks around the term hypnosis to reflect his concerns. Some interpreted this as an expression of a cavalier and dismissive attitude about the entire field. That interpretation became increasingly untenable as Barber examined hypnotic behavior with unprecedented care and demonstrated that these behaviors were not what they appeared to be and that many widely held assumptions about the phenomena were either incorrect or incomplete.

Barber served as president of Division 30 (Psychological Hypnosis) of the American Psychological Association and of the Massachusetts Psychological Association and was a fellow of both organizations. He served on the editorial boards of many journals and received the Presidential Award for Lifetime Contributions to the Field of Hypnosis from the Society for Clinical and Experimental Hypnosis, as well as the Award for Distinguished Contributions to Scientific Hypnosis from Division 30.

For all his criticism of the theoretical underpinnings and interpretation of hypnosis, Barber acknowledged that dramatic outcomes were possible when such processes were properly utilized.

Later in his career, Barber addressed newer but competing theories of hypnosis that were based on dissociation. He proposed a three-dimensional description of hypnosis. He theorized that there are three distinct subtypes of good hypnotic subjects: the fantasy prone, the amnesia-prone, and the highly motivated positively set subjects.

==== Barber and Calverley ====
Barber and David Smith Calverley (1937–2008) were American psychologists who worked and published together on measuring hypnotic susceptibility. One result of their research was showing that the hypnotic induction was not superior to motivational instructions in producing a heightened state of suggestibility. The Barber Suggestibility Scale, a product of their research, measures hypnotic susceptibility with or without the use of a hypnotic induction.

=== Birds ===
In 1993, Barber authored The Human Nature of Birds, a book on animal intelligence which advocates a theory that all sentient non-human animals, notably birds have intellectual abilities. The book argues against the view that animal behaviour can solely be explained by instinct and genetic programming. Barber cited examples of caring, flexibility, language, playing, working, concept building, individuality, cause and effect understanding and musical abilities in birds. He stated that birds have "willful intelligent awareness". Barber's research focused predominantly on bird behaviour but also on ants, fish and other animals.

A review in the Bird Observer noted that "the book is a long, polemical argument that criticizes the scientific establishment for its anti-anthropomorphic (attributing human characteristics to nonhuman animals) stance, and attempts to convince the reader that new scientific discoveries show a world in which intelligence is found in birds, other vertebrates, and even in the insect world." Ethologist Jack Hailman negatively reviewed the book for promoting a straw man argument about what scientists believe about birds. Hailman quoted Barber as saying that the "official scientific view" of birds is that they are instinctual automata but according to Hailman this has never been an official view in the fields of ethology and ornithology but Barber argued against this view many times in his book.

== Other interests ==
Although hypnosis was the main focus of Barber's research, his other interests included investigator bias, psychical phenomena, and comparative psychology, as reflected in his book The Human Nature of Birds (1993). His later unpublished work focused on the mind–body problem and is purported to advance a type of panpsychism.

The results of this final project, to be published posthumously, argues that consciousness, intelligence, and purposefulness can be found throughout the universe, from cells to planets.

At a meeting of the executive council of CSI in Denver, Colorado, in April 2011, Barber was selected for inclusion in CSI's Pantheon of Skeptics. The Pantheon of Skeptics was created by CSI to remember the legacy of deceased fellows of CSI and their contributions to the cause of scientific skepticism.

== Publications ==
Theodore Xenophon Barber

- Hypnosis: A Scientific Approach (1969)
- LSD, Marihuana, Yoga and Hypnosis (1970)
- Biofeedback and Self-Control (1971)
- Hypnosis, Imagination, and Human Potentialities (1974) [with Nicholas Spanos and John F. Chaves]
- Pitfalls in Human Research: Ten Pivotal Points (1976)
- Advances in Altered States of Consciousness & Human Potentialities (1976)
- The Human Nature of Birds: A Scientific Discovery with Startling Implications (1994)
