= List of fictional hypnotists =

This page is a list of fictional hypnotists.

== A–F ==
- Alucard – protagonist and antihero of the Hellsing manga and anime series created by Kouta Hirano; can communicate telepathically and hypnotize others
- Black Widow (Natasha Romanova) – superhero in comic books published by Marvel Comics
- Blood King - Brave Animated Series
- Bluto – in Popeye comics and cartoons
- Braden – Revenge of the Ninja
- Captain Universe – a Marvel Comics superhero; can hypnotize using his Uni-Vision energy
- The Amazing Conroy – in books by Lawrence M. Schoen
- Kenny Craig – Little Britain
- Crystal Ball, member of Cobra (G.I. Joe)
- Dansen Macabre – a Marvel Comics supervillain
- Diijon – The Mask of Diijon
- Doctor Druid – Marvel Comics
- Doctor Occult – DC Comics
- Doctor Nikola – in books by Guy Boothby
- Doctor Strange – Marvel Comics
- Dominique the Cyclops – Trigun
- Dracula – Marvel Comics
- Count Dracula
- Eh-Tar, a.k.a. Mr. Rathe - ‘’Young Sherlock Holmes’’
- Fakir – Cigars of the Pharaoh
- Vince Faraday – The Cape
- Fiddler – DC Comics
- Foreigner – Marvel Comics

== G–L ==
- Gambit – Marvel Comics
- Hypno - Pokémon
- Hypno-Hustler – Marvel Comics
- Hypnota – DC Comics
- Hypnotia – Marvel Comics
- Jafar – Disney's Aladdin (1992)
- Jean-Claude – in books by Laurell K. Hamilton
- Jose Baden, the "First Officer", from the survivor faction of Identity V.
- Kaa – The Jungle Book
- Karen, one of Crazy Jane's superpowered alters – Doom Patrol
- Kindness Brave - Brave Animated Series
- "Kujaku", assassin using hypnotic light projectors disguised as peacock feathers and cybernetic implants – Goku Midnight Eye
- Kurumu Kurono – Rosario + Vampire
- Lelouch Lamperouge – Code Geass
- Lilith – Marvel Comics
- Lira – Encantadia

== M–R ==
- Mad Hatter (Jervis Tetch) – supervillain from DC Comics based in Gotham City, adversary of Batman. A master hypnotist who is delusional and believes himself to be the incarnation of Cappellaio Matto, A.K.A The Hatter, from Lewis Carroll's Alice's Adventures in Wonderland.
- Mandrake the Magician and his archenemy The Cobra
- The Master – Doctor Who
- Samira Mayer – Caminhos do Coração
- Dominick Medina - the villain in The Three Hostages, a Richard Hannay adventure by John Buchan
- Mentok the Mind-Taker – Hanna-Barbera
- Mesmero – Marvel Comics
- Miracle Man – Marvel Comics
- Mister Mind and the Monster Society of Evil – Fawcett Comics; DC Comics
- Monk – DC Comics
- Morbius, the Living Vampire – Marvel Comics
- Baron Mordo – supervillain in comic books published by Marvel Comics, skilled at astral projection, hypnosis, and mesmerism
- Nati – Caminhos do Coração
- Orb – Marvel Comics
- Paibok – Marvel Comics
- Austin Powers
- Ringmaster – Marvel Comics
- Dr. Jeffrey Rosenberg/Van Helsing – Love at First Bite
- Ruvi, a member of the Carnival of Crime – The Cape
- Slowpoke Rodriguez – Looney Tunes

== S–Z ==
- Satana Hellstrom – Marvel Comics
- Sauron – Marvel Comics
- Amanda Sefton – also known as Daytripper and the second Magik; a witch in the Marvel Universe; can summon powers including hypnotism
- Screenslaver – character created by Evelyn Deavor in Incredibles 2 who uses screens to control people by relaying an image in front of their eyes, is the main antagonist in the film.
- The Shadow and his enemies Shiwan Khan and Dr. Rodil Moquino
- Sinistron, amalgamation of DC's Psimon and Marvel's Mister Sinister – (Amalgam Comics)
- Siren – DC Comics
- Spellbinder – DC Comics
- Sublimino – Ben 10
- Super-Skrull – Marvel Comics
- Sousuke Aizen – Bleach
- Svengali – Trilby by George du Maurier
- Universo – DC Comics
- Vlad – Caminhos do Coração
- Zorin Blitz – Hellsing

== See also ==
- Hypnotism
- List of hypnotists
- Mind control
