= The Hypnotic Eye =

1960 film by George Blair

- Theatrical poster to The Hypnotic Eye
- Directed by: George Blair
- Written by: Gitta Woodfield; William Read Woodfield
- Produced by: Charles B. Bloch; Ben Schwalb Birchwood
- Starring: Jacques Bergerac; Allison Hayes
- Cinematography: Archie R. Dalzell
- Edited by: William Austin
- Music by: Marlin Skiles
- Production company: Allied Artists
- Distributed by: Allied Artists Pictures
- Release date: February 27, 1960
- Running time: 79 minutes
- Country: United States
- Language: English
- Budget: $365,000

The Hypnotic Eye is a 1960 horror film, released by Allied Artists on February 27, 1960, starring Jacques Bergerac, Allison Hayes, Merry Anders, Joe Patridge and Ferdinand Demara (billed as "Fred Demara").

== Plot ==
A young woman enters her kitchen, rubbing shampoo into her hair. She lights a gas burner on her stove and bends over it as if it were the sink, setting her hair on fire. Later, doctors and police tend her, and Detective Dave Kennedy asks why she did it. She does not remember and soon dies. In the next months, ten more women mutilate their faces. Dave consults his psychiatrist friend Dr. Philip Hecht, who is an expert on hypnosis and disapproves of its use on the stage.

Dave, his girlfriend Marcia Blaine, and her friend Dodie Wilson go to see the stage show of a hypnotist named Desmond. Dave does not believe in hypnotism. Desmond calls for three women as volunteers. His assistant, Justine, chooses two of them, including Dodie. Desmond hypnotizes Dodie, instructs her to become rigid as a board, and levitates her. Before bringing Dodie out of it, he whispers something in her ear. Dave insists Dodie was faking. She denies it, and does not accompany them for coffee. She returns to the theater afterward. Later, at home, she pours acid instead of lotion into her washbasin, and applies it to her face.

Dave and Marcia question her in the hospital, but she does not remember the acid incident. Marcia wonders if a post-hypnotic suggestion from Desmond could have caused her to mutilate herself. She returns to the theater to investigate and is chosen by Justine as a volunteer. Desmond uses a device with concentric circles of flashing light to hypnotize her. Marcia closes her eyes before he tells her to and is not hypnotized.

Marcia reports her experiences to Dave and Dr. Hecht. She says Desmond gave her a post-hypnotic command to come to his dressing room at midnight. When she does, Marcia opens a box in which the device is flashing and is genuinely hypnotized. Dave and Dr. Hecht follow them as Desmond takes her to a fancy restaurant, to a beatnik coffee-house, and back to her apartment. They embrace behind closed drapes. Dave jealously thinks that she is a willing participant but Dr. Hecht wants to wait and get more information.

Desmond is interrupted by Justine. She dismisses him and keeps Marcia under hypnosis herself. He resentfully asks, "How many more?" Justine replies, "As long as there are faces like this." She turns on Marcia's shower, making the water scalding hot, and tells Marcia to step into the "cool refreshment". Dave pounds on the door and demands to be let in. Justine answers the door but stalls him. She commands Marcia to describe her as an old school roommate and leaves. Dave sees through this story, knowing Marcia never went to boarding school. Marcia's subsequent unusual behavior convinces Dave and Hecht that Marcia really was hypnotized.

They interview past victims, but all deny ever attending Desmond's performance or meeting Justine. Dave eventually finds a balloon with Desmond's "hypnotic eye" design on it, a prop given out at the show, in the purse of a woman who blinded herself. Even Dodie denies ever seeing Desmond's show or knowing Justine; the attending doctor says that she was terrified of that name when she was brought to the hospital.

Marcia, still hypnotized, returns to the show. Desmond demonstrates mass hypnosis and the power of suggestion, convincing the entire audience that the balloons are too heavy to lift. Dave and Dr. Hecht charge into the auditorium, but Desmond tries to stop them with the hypnotic eye. Dave resists its power and they climb the stage. Justine drags Marcia up onto a high catwalk, threatening to jump with her if they try to apprehend her. Dave tries to reason with Justine, who reveals her intention of rendering beautiful women ugly and removes a her own lifelike mask: it hides a horribly disfigured face. She instructs Desmond to kill Hecht. Dave shoots Desmond. Justine screams Desmond's name and jumps to her death. Dave rescues Marcia as she comes out of her trance.

Dr. Hecht addresses the audience, warning them never to let themselves be hypnotized without medical supervision.

== Cast ==
- Jacques Bergerac as Desmond
- Allison Hayes as Justine
- Marcia Henderson as Marcia Blaine
- Merry Anders as Dodie Wilson
- Joe Patridge as Det. Sgt. Dave Kennedy
- Guy Prescott as Dr. Philip Hecht
- Fred Demara (Ferdinand Demara) as Hospital Doctor
- Jimmy Lydon as Emergency Doctor (as James Lydon)
- Lawrence Lipton as King of the Beatniks

== Production background ==
Some scenes showing Eric "Big Daddy" Nord playing bongo drums and Lawrence Lipton as "King of the Beatniks" were supposedly filmed at Nord's beatnik cafe, The Gas House, in Venice, California. They were actually shot in a studio.

A consultant for the film was hypnotist Gil Boyne. Boyne founded the American Council of Hypnotist Examiners and the Hypnotism Training Institute in Glendale, California. He performed live shows between screenings of the film at the Golden Gate Theater in San Francisco, and went on a press tour to promote the movie. He appeared on numerous TV news and talk shows performing live hypnosis demonstrations.

"Hypnomagic", a concept used to market the film, was not a film process like 3D. It was advertised on the posters as an "Amazing New Audience Thrill", and was claimed to be more organic and a time-tested process. It consisted of Bergerac looking directly into the camera as if performing his hypnosis demonstration for the movie theater audience. The film depicted a demonstration of suggestion that used toy balloons stenciled with a "Hypnotic Eye" symbol; identical balloons were distributed to audience members during the film's theatrical run, and the audience was encouraged to "participate" in the on-screen demonstration.

== Influence on popular culture ==
There is a scene in the film where a lady while in the trance state thinks her stove is her sink and washes her hair in the stove, receiving horrific burns and disfigurement. In the 1960s the Kodak film company took that scene and using a then cutting edge process made a lenticular photograph out of it. When moving the photo up and down the girls head would catch on fire. The photograph was a little larger than a business card and used as a giveaway to buyers, to spotlight the new photo process that the Kodak company was promoting at the time.
