= Sports hypnosis =

Hypnotherapy to enhance sporting performance

Sports hypnosis refers to the use of hypnotherapy with athletes in order to enhance sporting performance. Hypnosis in sports has therapeutic and performance-enhancing functions. The mental state of athletes during training and competition is said to impact performance. Hypnosis is a form of mental training and can therefore contribute to enhancing athletic execution. Sports hypnosis is used by athletes, coaches and psychologists.

== History ==
Hypnosis has been used in various professions including dentistry, medicine, psychotherapy and sports, as a performance enhancement tool. Sports hypnosis incorporates cognitive and sports science methodologies. Hypnosis in sports therefore overlaps with areas such as biomechanics, nutrition, physiology and sports psychology. Generally sports hypnosis is studied within the field of sports psychology, which examines the impact of psychological variables on athletes' performance. While sports psychology began to be studied around the 1920s, the study and use of hypnosis was not documented until the 1950s. Members of the Russian Olympic team are said to have made use of hypnosis as a performance-enhancing tool around this time.

== Application ==
Although not referred to as hypnosis, professional athletes and teams have used an approach called guided imagery, which is much similar to techniques used in sports hypnosis.

Hypnosis is one of several techniques that athletes may employ to accomplish their sporting goals and it is equally beneficial to coaches as well as athletes. Hypnosis may do for the mind what physical activity does for the body of an athlete. The theory behind sports hypnosis is that relaxation is key to improved sporting performance and athletes may perform better if they are able to relax mentally and focus on the task at hand. Hypnosis may help athletes attain relaxation during practise and competition. Hypnosis may also help to control anxiety and manage stress in athletes. Athletes may develop auto-response to preestablished stimuli which is geared towards achieving optimal performance levels. Sports Hypnosis can also eliminate phobic responses, such as 'Trigger Freeze' in the Clay Pigeon Shooter, 'Target Panic' in the Archer and Fears of further injury in sports people following injury.

The impact of hypnosis on various aspects of sporting performance has been studied. Research has studied the role of hypnosis in enhancing basketball skills, on flow-state and golf-putting performance, its impact on long-distance runners, on archery performance and on flow states and short-serve in badminton.

The use of hypnosis in sports offers the following potential benefits that may help athletes handle personal challenges that would otherwise negatively affect sporting performance. Hypnosis:

- Helps to reinforce established sporting goals
- Aids athletes to better handle nervousness
- Contributes to relaxation
- Facilitates stress management
- Increases concentration
- Eliminates sports phobia responses
- Provides the ability to eliminate distractions
- Assists in controlling pain
- Increases performance motivation
- Improves bodily awareness

== See also ==
- Hypnosis
- Hypnotherapy
- Performance psychology
- Sport psychology
