= Theodore R. Sarbin =

American psychologist (1911–2005)

Theodore Roy Sarbin
- Born: 8 May 1911; Cleveland, Ohio, U.S.
- Died: 31 August 2005 (aged 94); California, U.S.
- Education: Ohio State University
- Known for: Hypnosis, role theory, narrative theory
- Awards: Fulbright and Guggenheim fellowships, Morton Prince Award, Lifetime Achievement Award (Western Psychological Association)
- Scientific career
- Fields: Psychology, Criminology, Hypnosis
- Workplaces: University of California, Berkeley, University of California, Santa Cruz, PERSEREC

Theodore Roy Sarbin (1911–2005) was an American psychologist and professor of psychology and criminology at the University of California, Santa Cruz. He was known as "Mr. Role Theory" because of his contributions to the social psychology of role-taking.

== Early life and education ==
Sarbin was born on May 8, 1911, in Cleveland, Ohio. He attended Ohio State University as an undergraduate and later obtained a master's degree from Case Western Reserve University. He received a Ph.D. in psychology from The Ohio State University in 1941.

== Work ==
Sarbin began his professional career as a research-oriented clinical psychologist, practicing first in Illinois and later in Los Angeles. His academic career was established at the University of California, Berkeley, where he served on the faculty from 1949 to 1969 and at the University of California, Santa Cruz where he was a professor of Psychology and of Criminology from 1969 to 1975. In addition, he served for varying periods on the faculty at the Naval Postgraduate School in Monterey. In 1987, he became a research psychologist for the Defense Personnel Security Research and Education Center (PERSEREC), a program of the U.S. Navy, where he continued to work until just before his death.

=== Role theory ===
Sarbin became known as "Mr. Role Theory" because of his seminal contributions and publications in the field of social psychology, relating to role-taking. Roles are socially constructed and can be used to explain a range of human behaviours including acting, shamanic possession, criminality, psychopathology, and hypnosis. Sarbin emphasised the difference between role-playing and role-taking, the latter being characterised by a greater degree of subjective involvement or identification with the role and belief in it.

=== Criminology ===
Sarbin's doctoral research used data gathered at the University of Minnesota to examine the relative accuracy of statistical versus clinical prediction for the academic achievement of undergraduates. As a young man Sarbin temporarily rode the rails as a hobo, and he felt this experience helped him to understand people excluded from the mainstream of society.

=== Psychopathology ===
Sarbin was particularly interested in the social psychology of psychopathology and argued that "mental illness" could be understood in terms of social constructs such as moral disapproval of the behavior in question.

=== Hypnotic susceptibility scales ===
In the 1930s, Sarbin collaborated on research on the measurement of hypnotic depth. In 1938, Friedlander and Sarbin introduced a composite scale based on a variety of responses to suggestion, and employing a standardised, scripted routine. Their work built upon earlier attempts by Davis & Husband (1931), Barry, MacKinnon & Murray (1931), and Clark L. Hull (1933). Instead of merely attempting to attribute hypnosis on the basis of certain “spontaneous” signs, these scales deliver scripted suggestions and rate the subject's response to each item on the scale, e.g., a score was given based on how long it took before a subject's eyes closed in response to suggestions of lid heaviness, etc. The "Friedlander-Sarbin Scale" could be easily replicated based upon the script provided, and so norms were collated from different samples. The tests employed were, eye-closure, eyelid catalepsy, arm immobilisation, arm rigidity, finger lock, verbal inhibition (unable to say own name), post-hypnotic hallucination of a voice, and post-hypnotic amnesia.

The Friedlander-Sarbin scale already contained a great many of the elements which were to become central to the influential Stanford Hypnotic Susceptibility Scales (SHSS) in the 1960s.

=== Social role theory of hypnosis ===
Sarbin subsequently became an early and influential critic of the "special state" theory of hypnosis, which interprets hypnotic responses as the result of a unique altered (abnormal) state of consciousness. In a seminal article on hypnotism, the personality psychologist Robert White, had argued that hypnotic subjects were actively trying to enact a socially constructed role.

Hypnotic behavior is meaningful, goal-directed striving, its most general goal being to behave like a hypnotised person as this is continuously defined by the operator and understood by the client.

Following White's radical interpretation of hypnosis, Sarbin used concepts from his own role theory, empirical research data, and analogies with other socially constructed roles, to argue in a much more rigorous manner that hypnotic subjects were not in a special state of consciousness but could be better understood as identifying with an unusual social role.

Sarbin's views on hypnosis were detailed in a number of journal articles before being reviewed in more depth in his book Hypnosis: A Social Psychological Analysis of Influence Communication (1971), co-authored with William C. Coe. Coe had received his doctorate, with a dissertation on hypnosis, under Sarbin while Sarbin was at the University of California at Berkeley. (Sarbin and Coe became collaborators on the role theory model of hypnosis throughout Coe's life.) Sarbin's role theory model of hypnotism became an important influence on subsequent nonstate and cognitive-behavioral theories of hypnosis.

=== Narrative psychology ===
From around 1985 onward, Sarbin became focused on the subject of narrative psychology, a field in which he is recognised as a pioneer. He adopted a method based upon the primacy of stories as a way of understanding human behavior in preference to the constraints of traditional psychological research paradigms.

=== Report on homosexuality in the military ===
Sarbin became known for his 1988 report critical of U.S. military policies regarding homosexual people. “Gays in Uniform,” found no proof for the assumption that homosexual people posed greater security risks than heterosexuals nor the idea that homosexual soldiers would disrupt military life.

== Awards and honors ==
In the course of his academic career, Sarbin received scores of honors, including both Fulbright and Guggenheim fellowships. He was a research scholar at Nuffield College of Oxford University in 1963. He was a Fellow on the faculty at the Center for Advanced Studies of Wesleyan University for the academic year 1968-1969 and returned there for another period in 1975. He received the Morton Prince Award from the Society for Clinical and Experimental Hypnosis and the Henry Murray Award from the American Psychological Association. He was recognized with a lifetime achievement award from the Western Psychological Association in 2001.

Just prior to his death, the American Psychological Association created a new award named after him, to be presented annually by one of its divisions, the Society for Theoretical Philosophical Psychology, and Sarbin was able to hand it to the first recipient.

== See also ==
- Hypnotherapy
- Hypnotic susceptibility

== Publications ==
Sarbin was the author of more than 250 professional publications, including six books, and six edited volumes.

- Sarbin, T.R. & Coe, W.C. (1972). Hypnosis: A Social Psychological Analysis of Influence Communication.
- Sarbin, T.R. & Coe, W.C. (1984). Mastering psychology: study habits, examination skills, locating resources, preparing term papers
- Sarbin, T.R. & Mancuso, J.C. (1980). Schizophrenia, medical diagnosis or moral verdict?
- de Rivera, J. and Sarbin, T.R. (ed.) (1998). Believed-in imaginings: the narrative construction of reality.
- Sarbin, T.R. (ed.) (1986). Narrative psychology: the storied nature of human conduct.
- Sarbin, T.R. & Pellegrini, R. (ed.) (2002) Between Fathers and Sons: Critical incident narratives in the development of men's lives
