= Ormond McGill =

- Hypnotherapist, stage hypnotist
- Born: Ormond Dale McGill; June 15, 1913; Palo Alto, California, U.S.
- Died: October 19, 2005 (aged 92); Palo Alto, California, U.S.
- Occupation: Stage Hypnotist
- Spouse: Delight Beth Olmstead (m. 1935; died 1978)

Ormond Dale McGill (June 15, 1913 – October 19, 2005) was an American stage hypnotist, magician and instructor who was considered to be the "Dean of American Hypnotists". He was also a writer and author of many books including Hypnotism and Mysticism of India (1979) and The New Encyclopedia of Stage Hypnotism.

== Early life ==
McGill was born in Palo Alto, California, to Julia (née Battelle) and Harry Aloysius McGill. His given name Ormond was chosen by his mother, after the last name of a childhood friend from her former residence in Omaha, Nebraska.

At age five, McGill was bitten by a monkey at a carnival in La Honda, leaving him with a permanent scar on his right hand after McGill's mother treated the bite with makeshift poultice. He performed his first magic tricks in fifth grade by showing off a water-to-wine-to-milk chemistry demonstration and developed an interest in stage theatrics after seeing a magic show by an illusionist named Herman Hansen at Pantages Theatre in San Francisco.

In 1927, after returning to Palo Alto from a brief move to Berkeley due to his father's work for AT&T, McGill began taking Tarbell Course in Magic lessons at the start of high school and studied hypnosis. Inspired by a performance of magician Charles Carter, McGill held his first full-length magic show at Palo Alto High School, with more complex tricks such as the bullet catch and a hypnosis act involving a homeless carny and a sledgehammer. McGill then took a side job as an assistant for a local magician. McGill graduated high school in 1931 and attended San Jose State College a year later to study psychology.

== Career ==
Between 1932 and 1940, McGill performed magic tricks at various Northern California resorts as a summer job. In 1934, he turned down an offer to be signed with Elwin-Charles Peck's El-Wyn Midnight Spook Party as he didn't want to quit college, but continued to visit magic shows at any opportunity, including a few by Long Tack Sam. After obtaining a bachelor's degree, McGill started his own traveling show, "Séance of Wonders", featuring horror-themed routines and costumed assistants typical of the midnight "spook shows" which were popular during that era. Between 1935 and 1954, McGill made a living as a stage magician, initially limited to the United States and Canada. On September 29, 1943, McGill married Delight Olmstead in Santa Monica.

In 1955, McGill first began touring worldwide, touring mostly for the U.S. military, in Australia, South Korea, the Philippines and Japan. Through Ron Ormond, who had named himself after McGill, he performed several filmed magic acts on a tour through the southern coastline of Asia. McGill's last overseas tour was in 1970 in New Zealand. During the 1970s and late 1980s, he authored several non-fiction books on eastern mysticism and hypnosis, returning to stage magic in 1982.

Ormond McGill also trained students for therapeutic applications through hypnotism beginning 1981, when he joined the Hypnotherapy Training Institute in Corte Madera. He wrote the Encyclopedia of Genuine Stage Hypnotism in 1947. Beginning 1999, at age 86, he hosted workshops in hypnotherapy, lecturing until a few days before his death.

McGill continued to collaborate with other colleagues including Gil Boyne, whom he mentored, and to teach hypnotherapy until his death in 2005 with Randal Churchill at the HTI.

== Other attributes ==
In addition to his career as a magician and stage hypnotist, McGill was also a skilled hypnotherapist and a student of Eastern mysticism. He wrote between twenty-five and forty books (sources disagree on the total), including such titles as Grieve No More Beloved (about his afterlife contact with his deceased wife), Hypnotism and Mysticism of India, and his autobiography, The Amazing Life of Ormond McGill. McGill has revealed the truth behind magical events such as the Indian rope trick and others during his visit to India.
