= Otto Georg Wetterstrand =

Swedish physician and psychotherapist

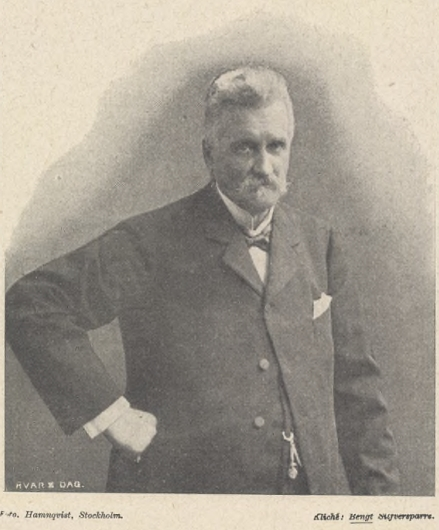

Otto Georg Wetterstrand (14 September 1845 – 11 July 1907) was a Swedish physician and psychotherapist who was a native of Skövde.

Wetterstrand studied medicine at the University of Uppsala, and in 1871 received his medical license at Karolinska Institute. Later he maintained a psychiatric practice in Stockholm.

Wetterstrand was a highly regarded psychoanalyst whose influence spread beyond Sweden, and is credited as the first Swedish doctor to use suggestive psychotherapy. Among his written works was Der Hypnotismus und dessen Anwendung in der praktischen Medicin, later translated into English and published as Hypnotism and its application to practical medicine (1897).

Wetterstrand was married to Agnes Cecilia Dahlbeck.
